= National Liberal Club =

London gentlemen's club

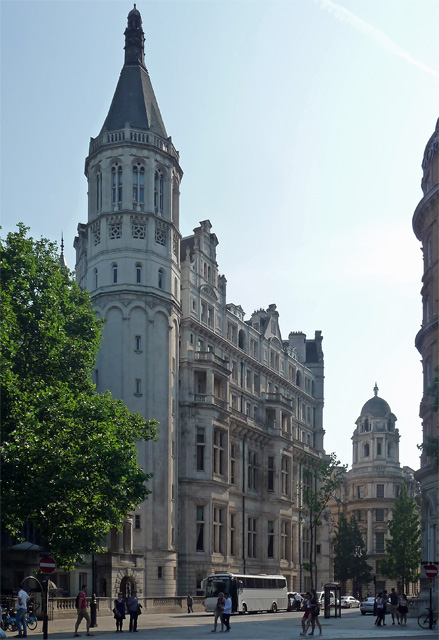
- View of the club from the Thames Embankment
- Alternative names: NLC; The National Liberal

General information
- Status: Private members' club
- Architectural style: French Renaissance
- Location: 1 Whitehall Place, London
- Coordinates: 51.5061°N 0.1238°W
- Groundbreaking: 1884
- Completed: 1887
- Opened: 1887

Design and construction
- Architect: Alfred Waterhouse

Website
- www.nlc.org.uk

The National Liberal Club (NLC) is a London private members' club, open to both men and women. It was established in 1882 to provide club facilities for Liberal Party campaigners among the newly enlarged electorate following the Third Reform Act in 1884, and was envisioned as a more accessible version of a traditional London club. Since 1947, it has also been the home of Liberal International.

The club's Italianate building on the Embankment of the river Thames is the second-largest club-house built in London. (It was the largest ever at the time, but was superseded by the later Royal Automobile Club building completed in 1911.) Designed by Alfred Waterhouse, it was completed in 1887. Its facilities include a dining room, a bar, function rooms, a billiards room, a smoking room, a library and an outdoor riverside terrace. It is located at Whitehall Place, close to the Houses of Parliament, the Thames Embankment and Trafalgar Square.

== History ==
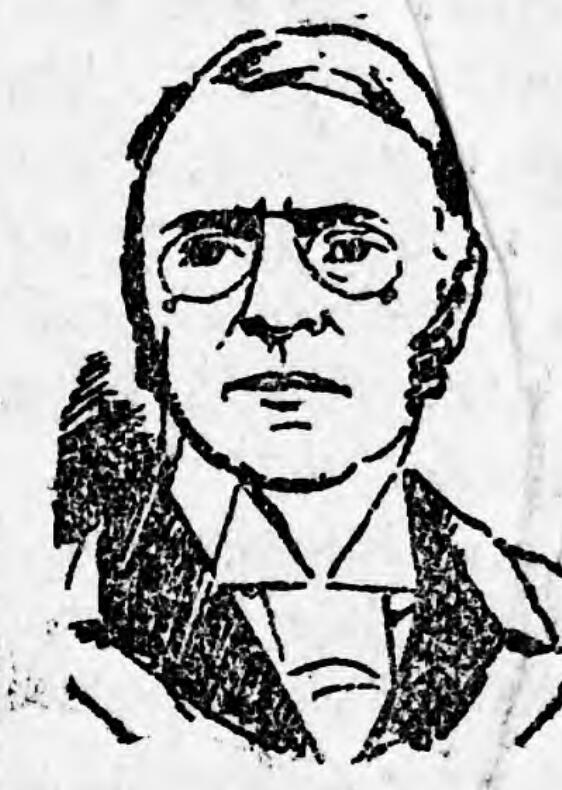
Arthur John Williams, who first proposed creating the club

=== Early years ===
The genesis of the club lay with Welsh Liberal party activist (and later MP) Arthur John Williams, who proposed the creation of such a club at a Special General Meeting of the short-lived Century Club on 14 May 1882, so as to provide "a home for democracy, void of the class distinction associated with the Devonshire and Reform Clubs". The first full meeting of the new club was held on 16 November 1882, at the (now-demolished) Westminster Palace Hotel on Victoria Street. The Century Club itself then merged into the NLC at the end of the year. In its early years, the club declared its objects to be:

1. The provision of an inexpensive meeting place for Liberals and their friends from all over the country.
2. The furtherance of the Liberal cause.
3. The foundation of a political and historical library as a memorial to Gladstone and his work.

An initial circular for subscribers meant that by the end of 1882, 2,500 members from over 500 towns and districts had already signed up for the new club, and membership would reach 6,500 by the time the clubhouse opened in 1887.

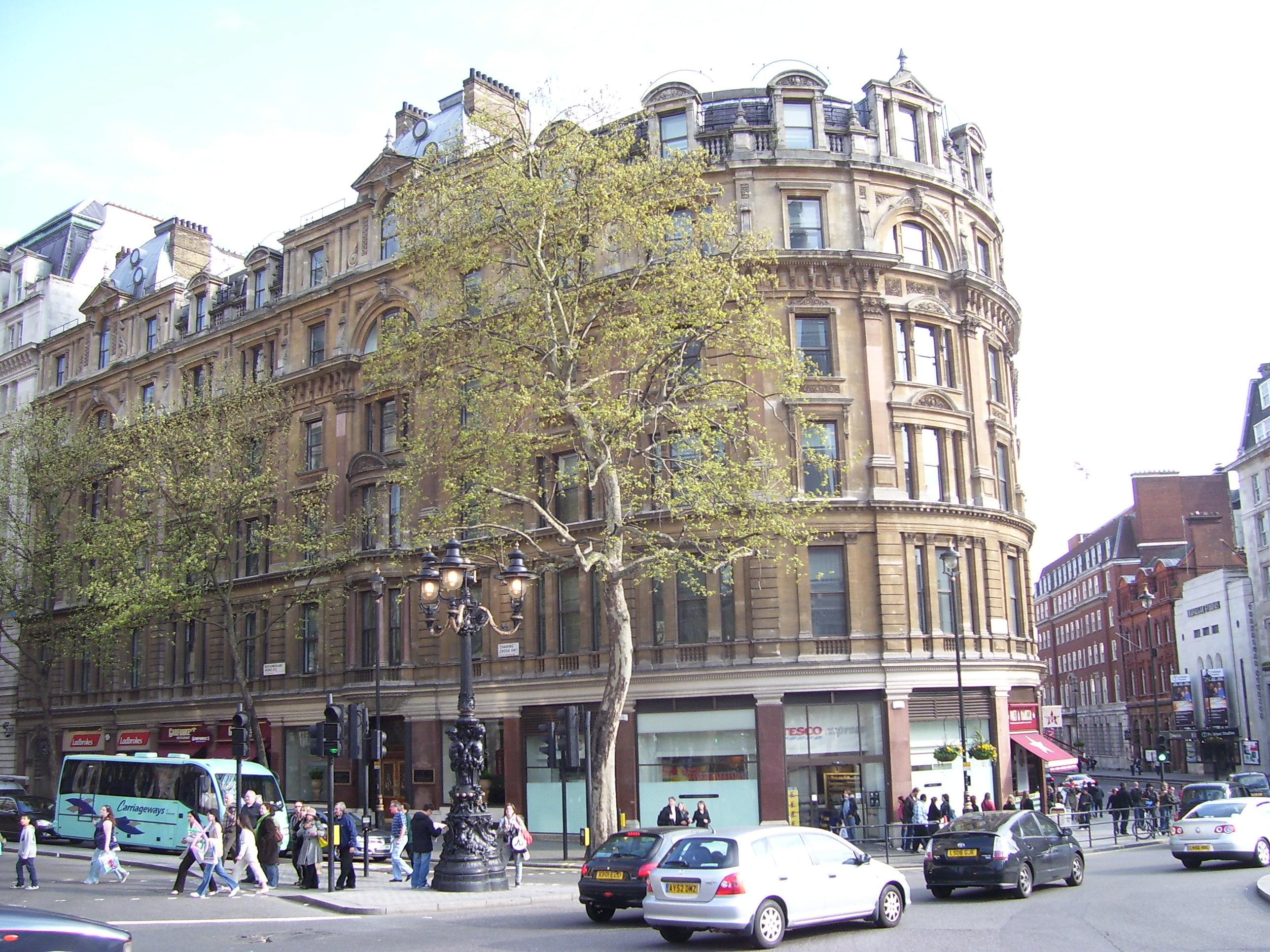
This Trafalgar Square building temporarily housed the NLC in 1883–87, whilst the club's own premises were being planned and then built.

An initial temporary clubhouse opened on Trafalgar Square in May 1883, on the corner of Northumberland Avenue and Whitehall. The club would be based here for the next four years. The opening of the first clubhouse was marked by an inaugural banquet for 1,900 people at the Royal Aquarium off Parliament Square, which Punch reported saw the consumption of 200 dozen bottles of Pommery champagne. During the club's time on Trafalgar Square, a parliamentary question was asked in the House of Commons about the White Ensign being raised on the club's flagpole as part of a prank.

The club's foundation stone on the modern clubhouse was laid by Gladstone on 9 November 1884, when he declared "Speaking generally, I should say there could not be a less interesting occasion than the laying of the foundation-stone of a Club in London. For, after all, what are the Clubs of London? I am afraid little else than temples of luxury and ease. This, however, is a club of a very different character", and envisioned the club as a popular institution for the mass electorate. However, another of the club's founders, G. W. E. Russell, noted "We certainly never foresaw the palatial pile of terra-cotta and glazed tiles which now bears that name. Our modest object was to provide a central meeting-place for Metropolitan and provincial Liberals, where all the comforts of life should be attainable at what are called 'popular prices'", but added "at the least, we meant our Club to be a place of "ease" to the Radical toiler. But Gladstone insisted that it was to be a workshop dedicated to strenuous labour." Funds for the clubhouse were raised by selling 40,000 shares of £5 each (equivalent to £537 in 2025), in a Limited Liability Company, with the unusual stipulation that "No shareholder should have more than ten votes", so as to prevent a few wealthy men from dominating the club. However, this only raised £70,000 (equivalent to £7,520,640 in 2025), and so an additional £52,400 was raised for the construction of the clubhouse by the Liberal Central Association. The remaining £30,000 necessary was raised by mortgage debentures.

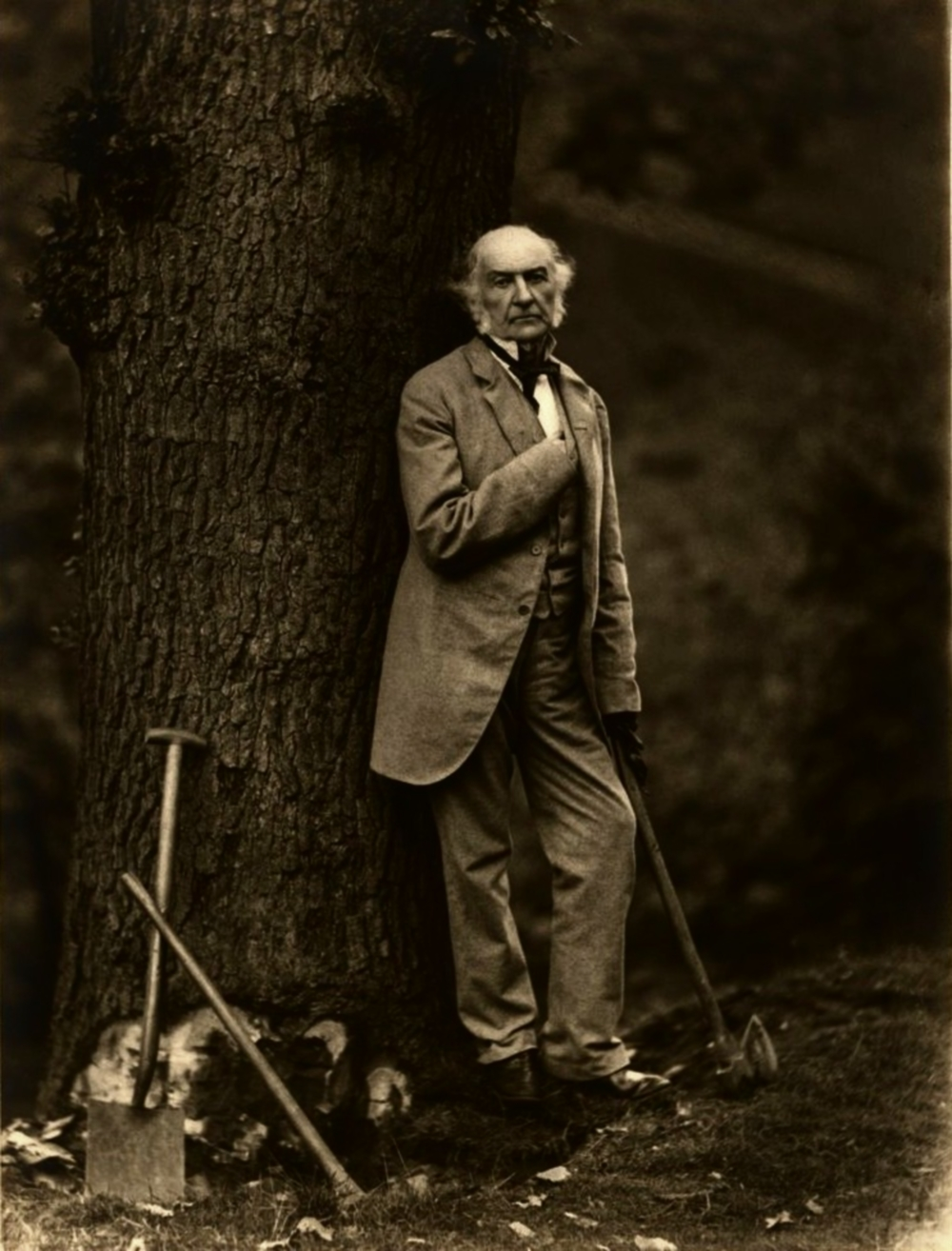
Former prime minister William Ewart Gladstone was the club's first president. A keen feller of trees in his spare time, his axe is still on display in the club smoking room today, along with a chest made from an oak tree cut down by Gladstone.

The clubhouse was still unfinished when it opened its doors in 1887, but it was opened early on 20 June to allow members to watch that year's Jubilee processions from the club terrace. It was when the club had only recently moved to its present address that "Bloody Sunday" ensued on its doorstep during the Trafalgar Square riot of 13 November 1887. NLC members flocked to the windows to watch George Bernard Shaw (a member of the club) address the demonstration, and later in the day, witnessed the bloodshed which ensued.

In its late-19th-century heyday, its membership was primarily political, but had a strong journalistic and even bohemian character. Members were known to finish an evening's dining by diving into the Thames. Of the club's political character, George Bernard Shaw remarked at a debate in the club, "I have never yet met a member of the National Liberal Club who did not intend to get into Parliament at some time, except those who, like our chairman Lord Carrington, are there already."

On the club's launch, it represented all factions of liberalism from whiggery to radicalism, but within four years it was rocked by the Home Rule Crisis of 1886, which saw the Liberal Unionists led by Joseph Chamberlain and the Marquess of Hartington (both of whom had been founder members of the NLC) secede from the party and eventually go into alliance with the Conservatives. Indeed, Chamberlain had been one of the NLC's most enthusiastic promoters upon its launch. At the 1884 ceremony of Gladstone's foundation-stone-laying for the club, Hartington had argued that the club would be the future home of Chamberlain's Radical Birmingham Caucus, and Chamberlain, standing next to him, pointedly refused to contradict him. Chamberlain himself resigned in 1886, shortly after the Home Rule split, Hartington and other prominent Liberal Unionists followed early in 1887, and when a further 130 Unionists simultaneously seceded from the club in 1889, the Scots Observer called it "one of the most important events that has recently occurred in home politics", due to its ramifications for the Liberal Party breaking in two.

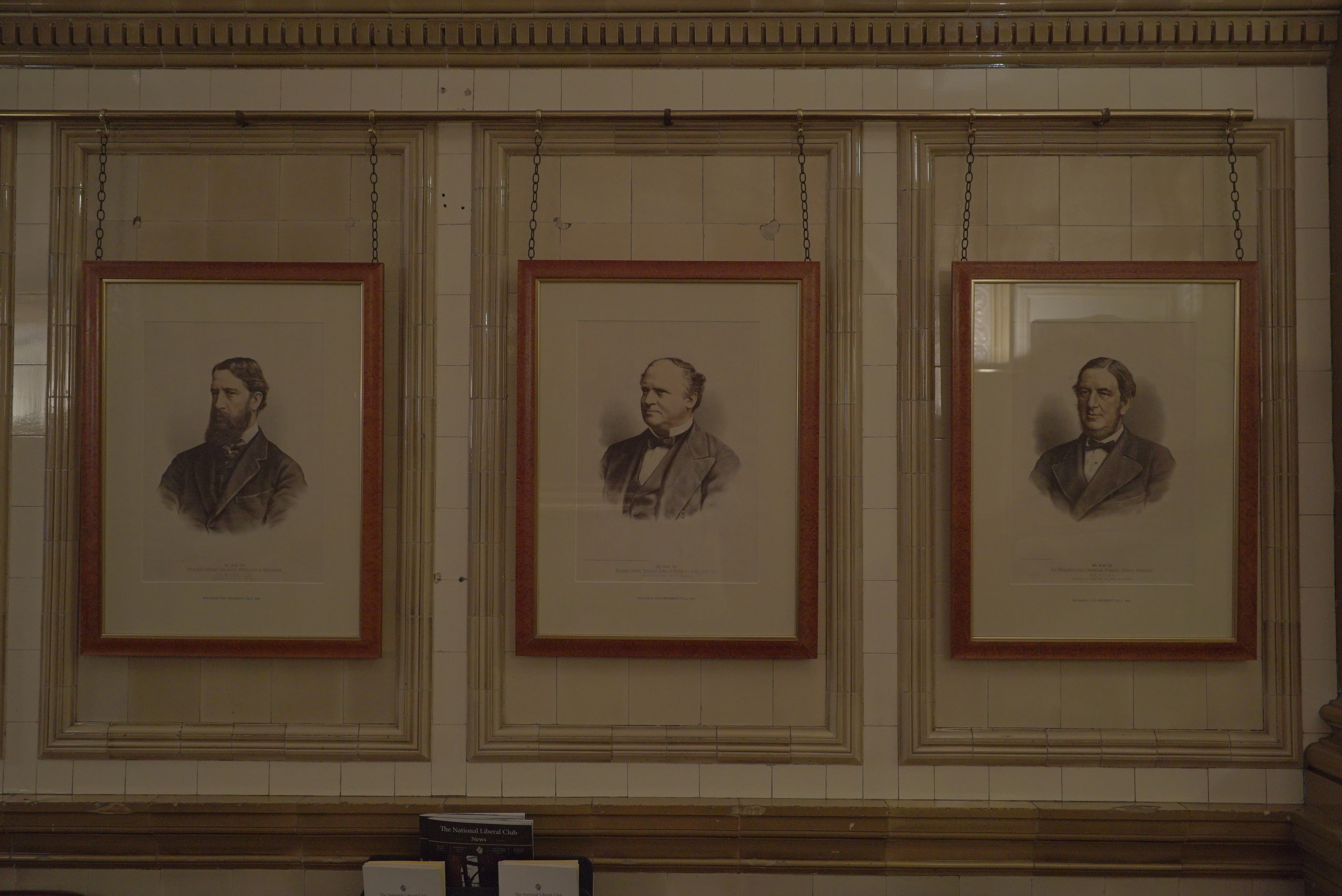
Three founding vice-presidents of the club: the Marquess of Hartington, Earl Granville, and William Vernon Harcourt. Within five years, Hartington would resign over the club's pro-Home Rule direction.

The club enjoyed a reputation for radicalism, and H. V. Emy records that Radicals secured

a distinct success when the Radical wing of the National Liberal Club (NLC) captured the club's organisation in the summer of 1897 and elected a new political committee with [Henry] Labouchere as the chairman and H. J. Reckitt as secretary. The Committee itself included Sir Robert Reid, [Philip] Stanhope, Herbert Samuel, Rufus Isaacs and W. F. Thompson, the editor of Reynold's News. The Committee wrote an open letter to the constituencies, asking them for their opinions on policy, designating several areas where opinion would be welcome. By November, the replies indicated that the weight of opinion lay with the democratisation of Parliament, involving the abolition of the Lords' veto, reform of registration and electoral law, and devolution. Amongst "other prominent reforms" were included all the major issues of the day (except nationalisation). These were then drafted into a manifesto of Radical reform which was "greatly resented by the official organisation." 38,000 copies were circulated, and a meeting of the General Committee of the NLF at Derby agreed to make reform a priority, a decision endorsed by [H. H.] Asquith a few days later.

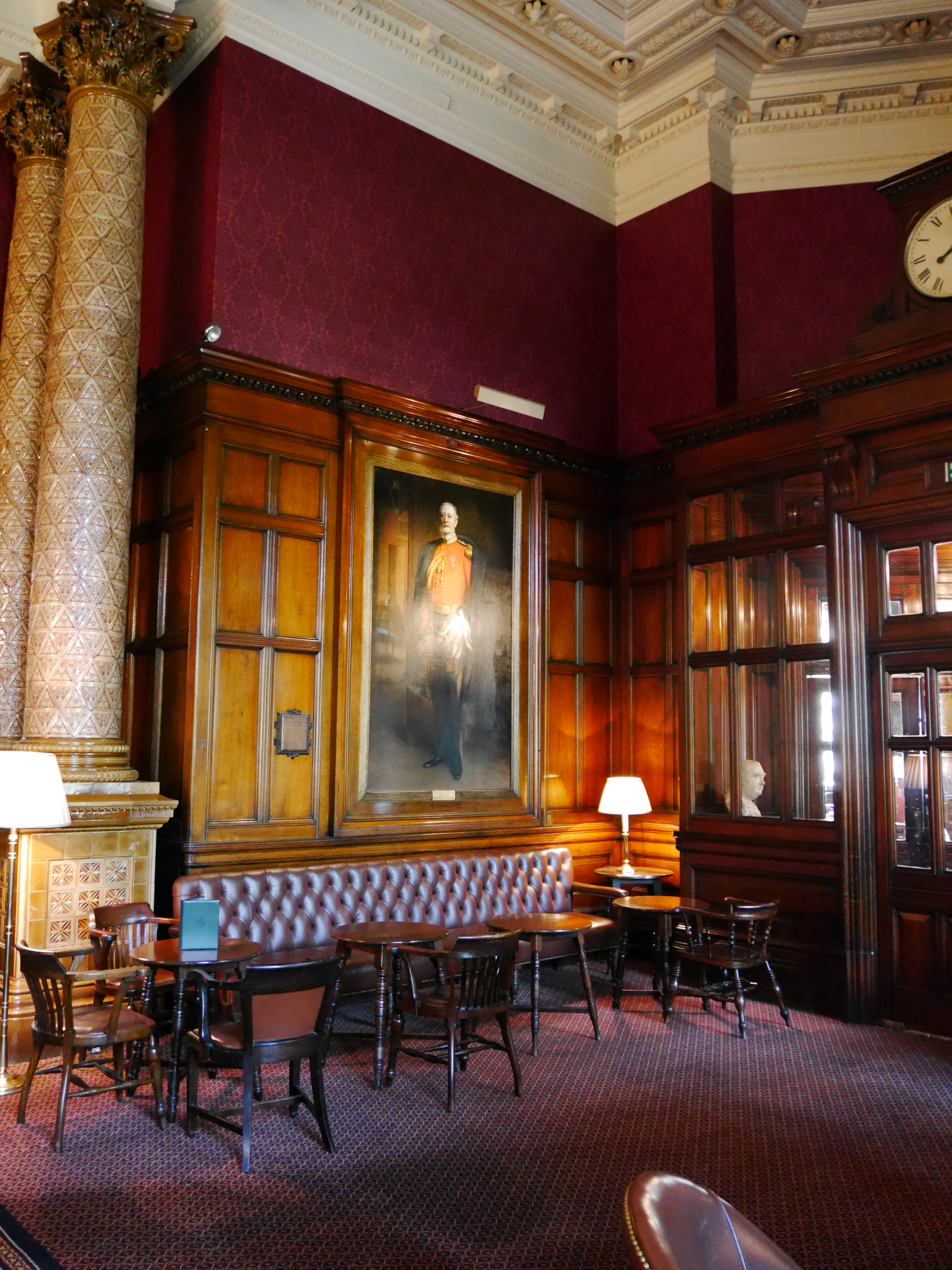
A portrait of the club's first chairman, Viscount Oxenbridge, hanging in the present Bar (previously a corner of the dining room)

This reputation for radicalism was underlined when former Liberal prime minister Lord Rosebery resigned from the club in September 1909, denouncing it as "a hotbed of socialism."

Several discussion groups met at the club, including the Rainbow Circle in the 1890s, an influential group of Liberal, Fabian and socialist thinkers who came to be identified with the Bloomsbury Group.

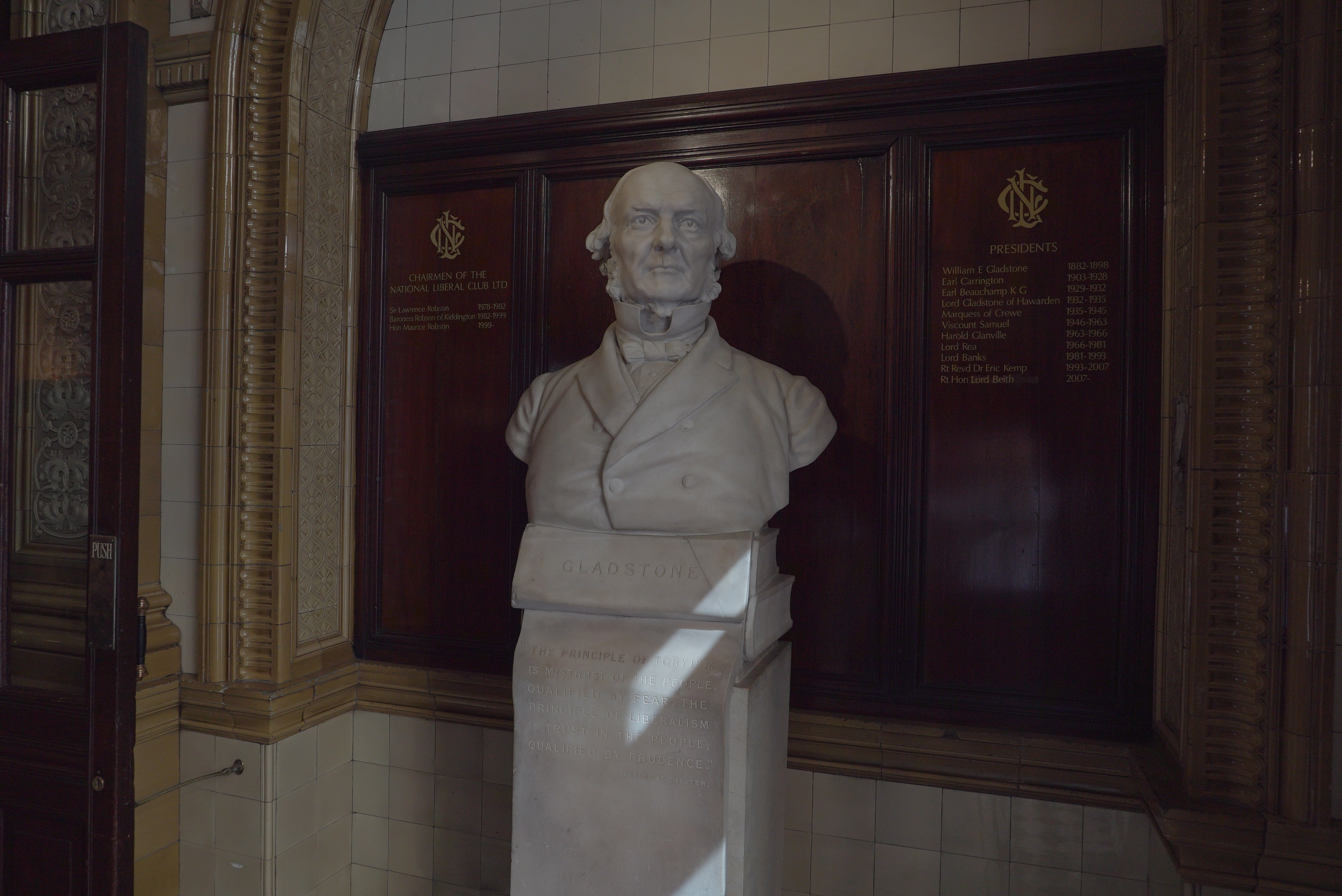
The bust of Gladstone by the club's front entrance. The inscription alludes to Gladstone's 1872 speech in which he argued ‘The principle of Liberalism is trust in the people, qualified by prudence. The principle of Conservatism is mistrust of the people qualified by fear.’.

It was also the site of much intrigue in the Liberal Party over the years, rivalling the Reform Club as a social centre for Liberals by the advent of the First World War, although its membership was largely based on Liberal activists in the country at large; it was built on such a large scale to provide London club facilities for Liberal activists from around the country, justifying its use of the description 'national'.

On 22 March 1893, during the Second Reading of the Clubs Registration Bill, the Conservative MP (who was later to defect to the Liberals) Thomas Gibson Bowles told the House of Commons "I am informed there is an establishment not far from the House frequented by Radical millionaires and released prisoners, the National Liberal Club, where an enormous quantity of whisky is consumed." Despite this remark, it seems that the club accounted for relatively little alcohol consumption by the standards of the day – Herbert Samuel commented in 1909 that the average annual consumption of alcoholic liquor per NLC member was 31s. 4d. per annum, which compared very favourably with equivalent Conservative clubs, including 33s. 5d. for the nearby Constitutional Club, 48s. for the City Carlton Club, and 77s. for the Junior Carlton Club. One possible explanation was the strength of the Temperance movement in the Liberal party at the time.

On 3 December 1909, Liberal chancellor David Lloyd George used the club to make a speech fiercely denouncing the House of Lords, in what was seen as a de facto launch of the "People's Budget" general election of January 1910.

On 21 November 1911, the club was one of a number of buildings to have their windows smashed in by the suffragette Women's Social and Political Union, in protest at the Liberal government's inaction over votes for women.

During the Marconi scandal of 1912, Winston Churchill used a speech to the club to mount an impassioned defence of embattled ministers David Lloyd George and Rufus Isaacs, asserting that there was "no stain of any kind" upon their characters.

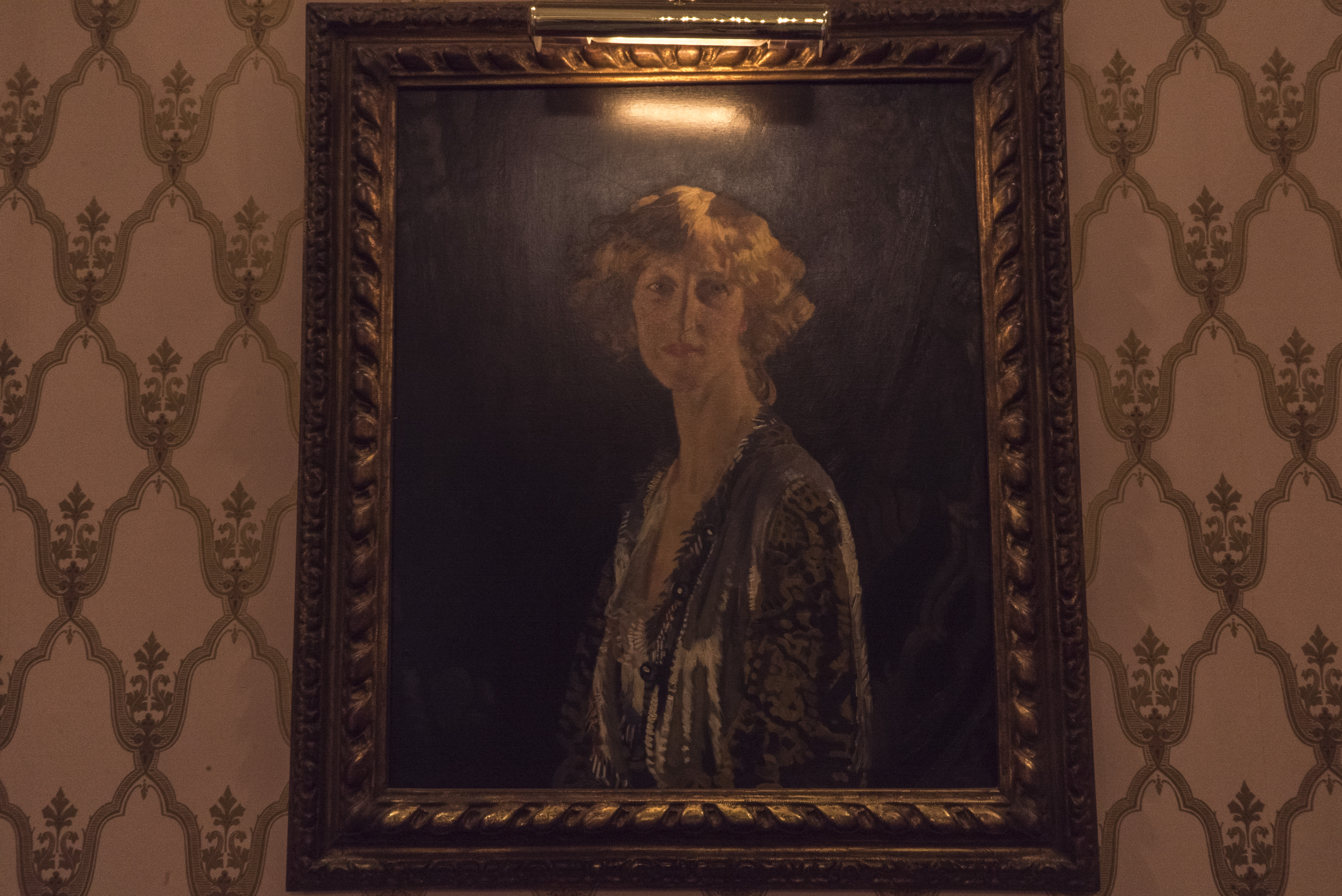
The club's portrait of First World War Liberal activist and diarist Violet Bonham Carter

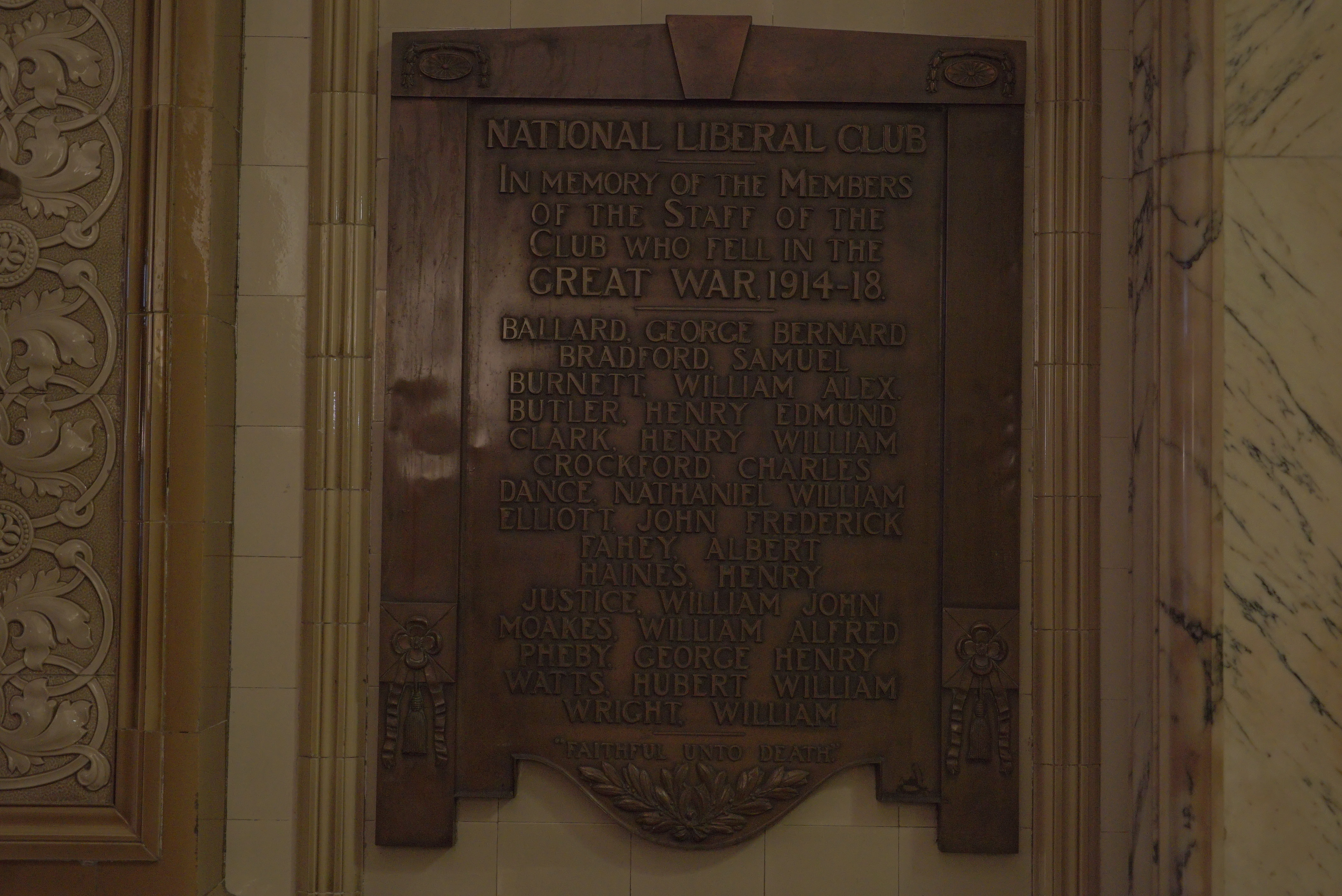
The club's war memorial, commemorating staff killed in the First World War

=== First World War ===
The club's cosmopolitan and internationalist make-up drew outside criticism as nationalist feelings rose in the First World War - the fervently anti-German and anti-semitic campaigner Arnold White wrote in his 1917 tract The Hidden Hand that:

an official of the National Liberal Club at the beginning of the war publicly ex- pressed the opinion that Germans would always be welcome. The spiritual home of every pro-German crank in the country was the National Liberal Club — a temple of luxury and ease where every enemy of England enjoyed the rites of hospitality. Enver [Pasha] when he was "Bey", and all the cosmopolitans, all the friends of every country but their own, were made welcome at the National Liberal Club.

From late 1916 to December 1919, the clubhouse was requisitioned by the British government for use as a billet for Canadian troops, the club relocating in the meantime to several rooms in the Westminster Palace Hotel - the venue of its original meetings in 1882–3. Many of the Canadian troops billeted in the clubhouse were offered heavily discounted temporary club membership during their stay, although it appears that some overstayed their welcome – a "farewell dinner" by the club on 19 March 1919 attempted to hint that their departure was imminently expected. At the end of the First World War, the Canadian soldiers who had stayed there presented the club with a moose head as a gift of thanks, which was hung in the billiards room for many years. After the troops finally left in December 1919, the club was closed for a year for renovations (partly necessitated by the damage done by the troops), and did not re-open until 19 December 1920.

As H. H. Asquith was deposed as prime minister by David Lloyd George, he spent his last full evening as prime minister on 8 December 1916 reporting to a full meeting of the Liberal Party at the club. It provided an overwhelming vote of confidence in his leadership.

=== Inter-war years ===
During the Liberal Party's 1916–23 split, the Asquith wing of the party was in the ascendant in the club, while Liberal prime minister David Lloyd George (who had been a regular by the smoking room in previous years, often found warming his bottom by the fireplace where his portrait now hangs) was personally shunned by many NLC members. This was a highly acrimonious time within the Liberal Party, with both the Asquithian and Lloyd Georgeite factions believing themselves to be the 'true' Liberal party, and viewing the other faction as 'traitors'. Michael Bentley has written of this period that "The Lloyd George Liberal Magazine, which appeared monthly between October 1920 and December 1923, spent much space attacking the National Liberal Club for its continued Asquithian partisanship – in particular for its refusal to hang portraits of Lloyd George and Churchill in the main club rooms, or to accept nominations for membership from Coalition Liberals. The creation of a separate '1920 Club' in neighbouring Whitehall Court was one reaction to this treatment." The Lloyd George and Churchill portraits were removed in 1921 and put into the club's cellar. At the time, the Asquithians were popularly known as "Wee Frees", and historian Cameron Hazlehurst wrote that, "the civilities of social life at the National Liberal Club were increasingly reserved by 'Wee Frees' for 'Wee Frees.'"

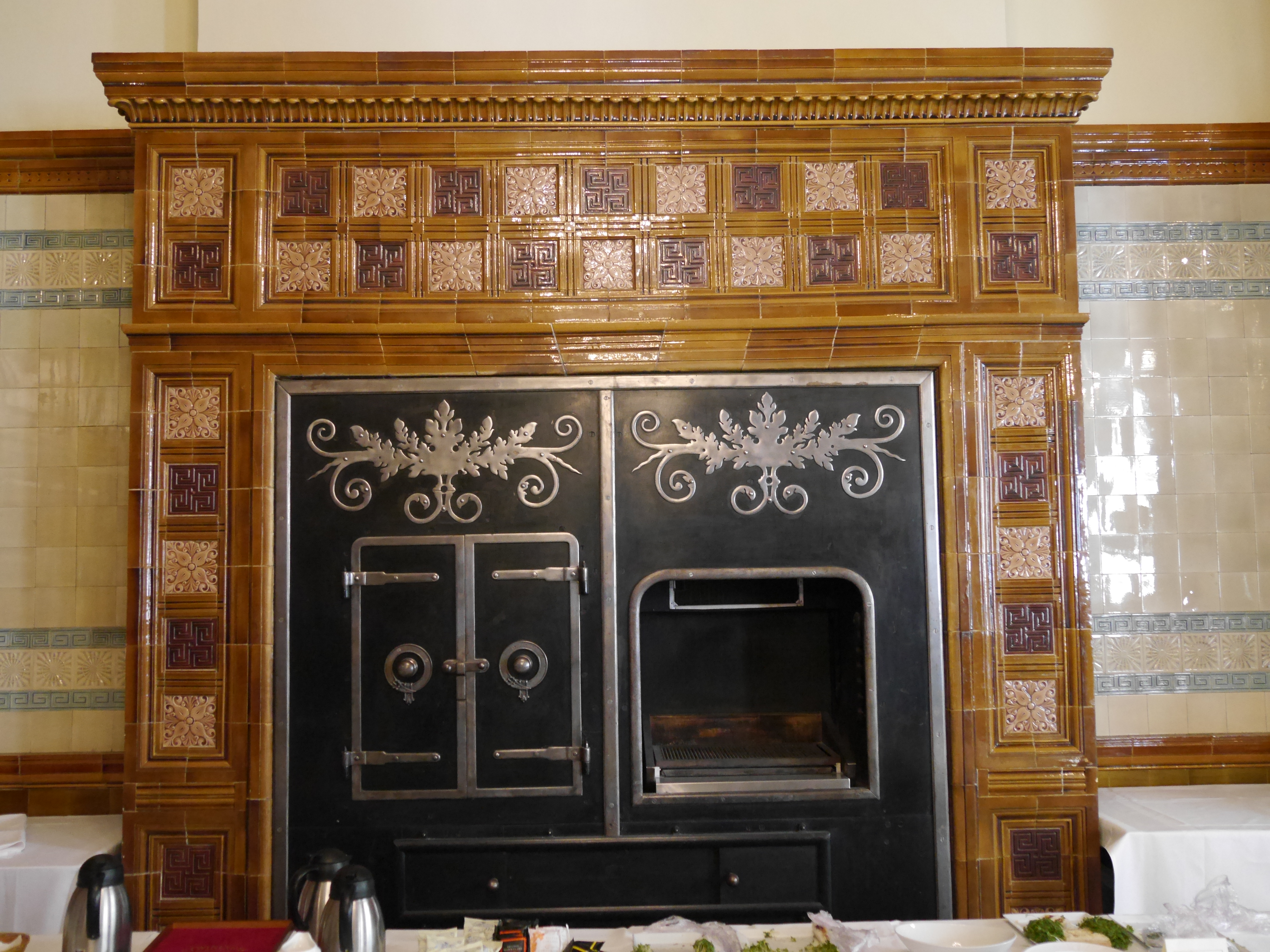
The tiling of the club's original Grill Room

The reunion of the two branches of the Liberal Party in the run-up to the December 1923 general election meant that the neighbouring 1920 Club for Lloyd George supporters was disbanded, and "the portraits of Lloyd George and [fellow Lloyd George Liberal] Churchill, long consigned to the cellar, were recovered and reinstated in the places of honour in the smoking room", although Churchill's defection back to the Conservatives within less than a year meant that his portrait was just as swiftly returned to the basement, and would not re-emerge for another 16 years.

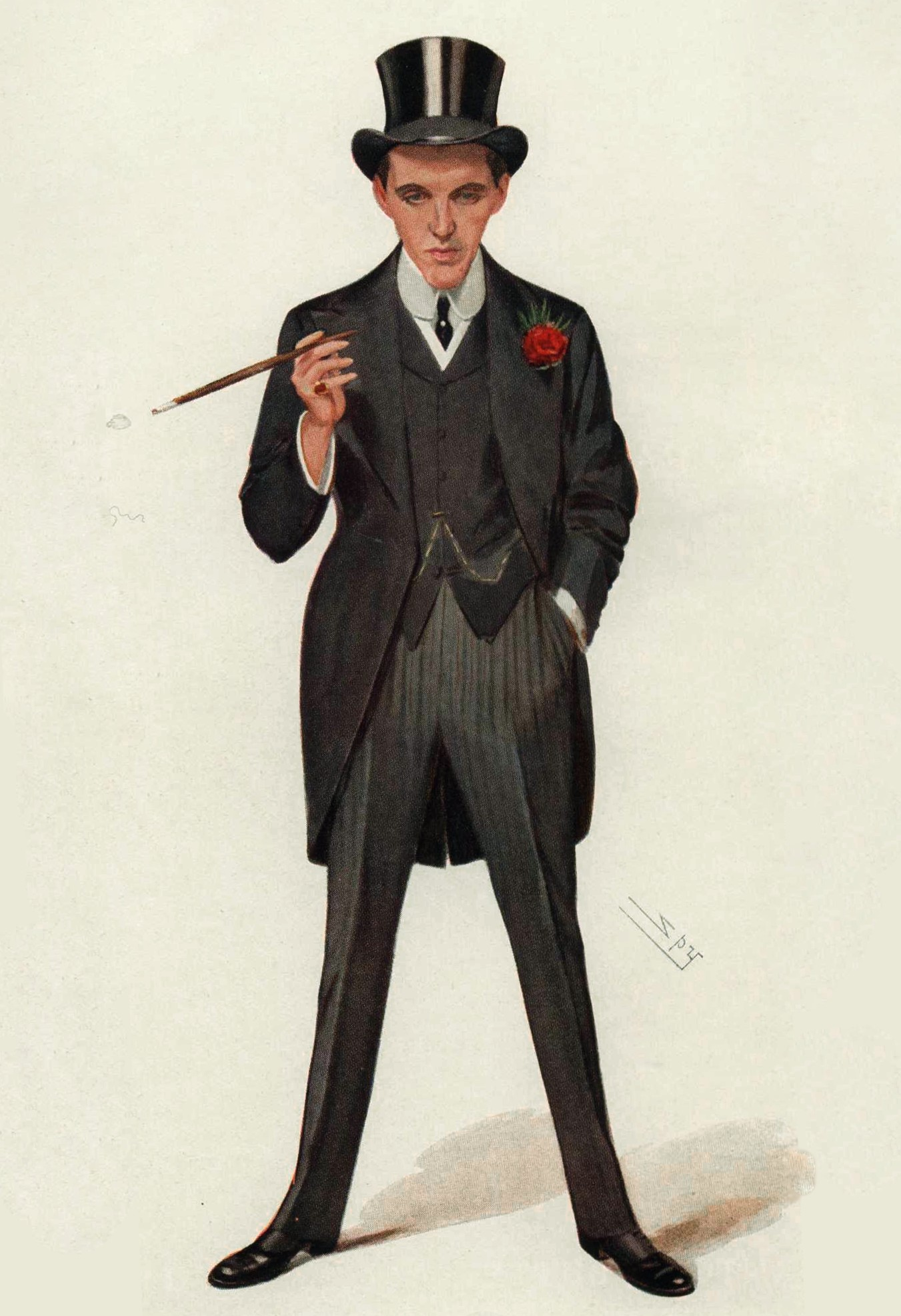
A copy of this print of F. E. Smith is on display in the same club facilities used by Smith, along with a caption recounting the well-known anecdote (see left).

There is a well-known story told of the NLC, that the Conservative politician F. E. Smith would stop off there every day on his way to Parliament, to use the club's lavatories. One day the hall porter apprehended Smith and asked him if he was actually a member of the club, to which Smith replied "Good God! You mean it's a club as well?". This story, and apocryphal variations thereof (usually substituting Smith with Churchill), are told of many different clubs. The original related to the NLC, at the half-way point between Parliament and Smith's chambers in Elm Court, Temple. The comment was a jibe at the brown tiles in some of the NLC's late-Victorian architecture.

During the hung parliament of 1923–24, it was at the club that Asquith – as Leader of the reunited Liberal Party – announced on 6 December 1923 that the Liberals would support Ramsay MacDonald in forming Britain's first ever Labour government.

The club continued to be a venue for large-scale meetings of Liberals. On Armistice Day 1924, over one hundred defeated Liberal candidates met at the club to express their anger at Lloyd George's failure to use his infamous "Lloyd George fund" to help the Liberals in the disastrous general election campaign one month earlier. After the 1929 general election, the first meeting of the newly expanded Parliamentary Liberal Party was held at the club, with all MPs except one (the independently minded Rhys Hopkin Morris) re-electing Lloyd George as Liberal Party Leader.

In 1932, the club first introduced non-political membership (now simply called Membership, in contrast to Political Membership). Michael Meadowcroft explains that this was done to provide, "membership for Liberals who, by reason of their employment, such as judges, military officers or senior civil servants, were not permitted to divulge their politics", and so who had been previously debarred by the club's insistence on all members signing a declaration of Liberal politics. This continues to this day, with Members signing a pledge that they will "not use the club or...membership thereof for political activities adverse to Liberalism", and not having full voting rights at Annual General Meetings, but otherwise enjoying the full benefits of club membership.

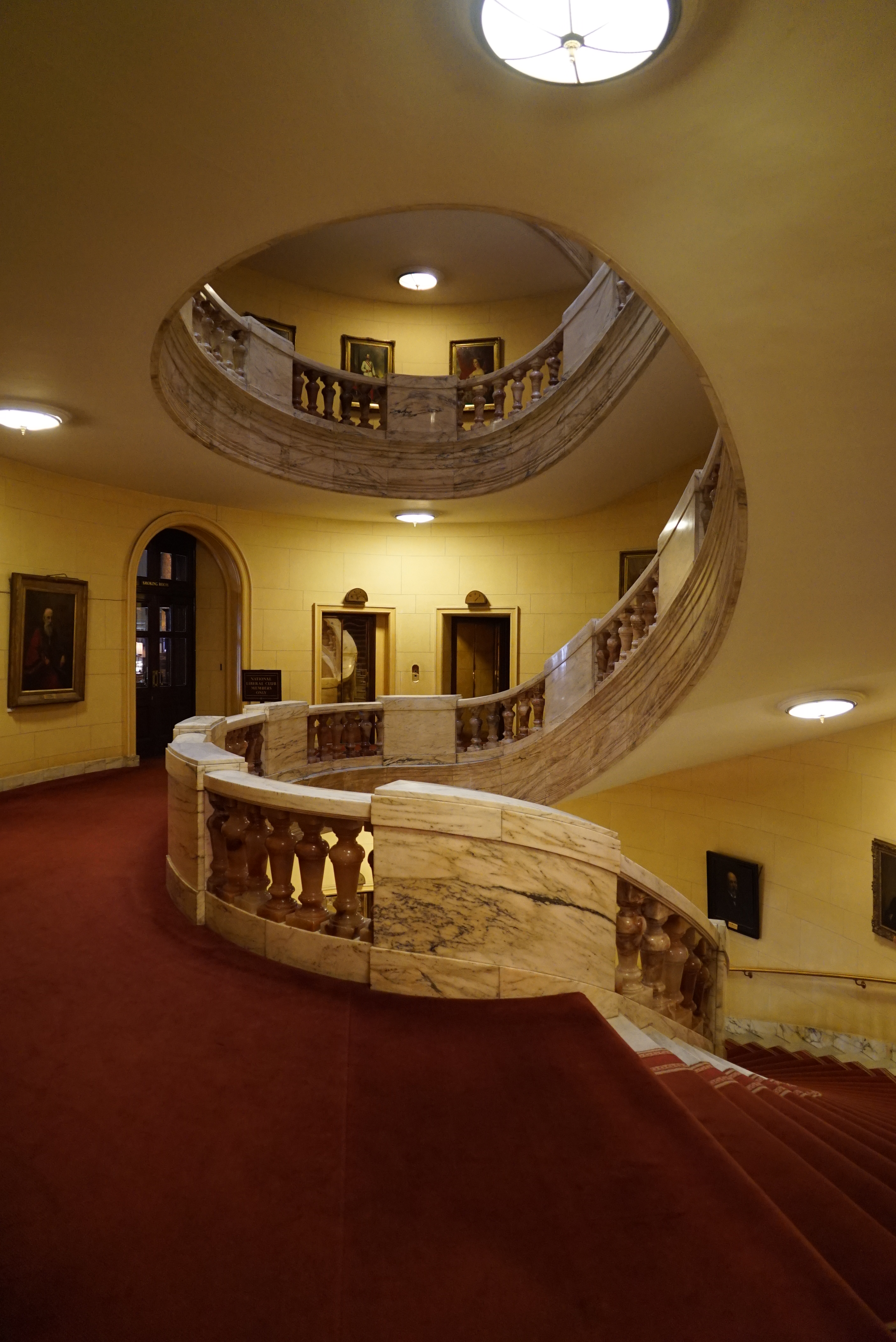
The main staircase, as reconstructed to a simplified design after the wartime bombing

=== Second World War ===
On 11 May 1941 the club suffered a direct hit by a Luftwaffe bomb during the Blitz, which utterly destroyed the central staircase and caused considerable damage elsewhere. The £150,000 cost of reconstructing the staircase in 1950 (equivalent to £4,439,988 in 2025) placed a considerable strain on the club's finances, although generous support from the War Damage Commission helped to fund the new staircase. In the nine-year interim between the bomb blast and the rebuilding of the staircase, members had to use the stairs of the club's turret tower, often taking highly circuitous routes around the vast clubhouse.

One of the items damaged in the blast was the 1915 portrait of Winston Churchill (a member of the club), by Ernest Townsend. Ironically, after 25 years of being hidden from sight, it had only just been put on display the year before. Painted in the year of the Dardanelles Campaign, Churchill was soon unavailable for unveiling the portrait as he went into exile in the trenches. After his return, his strong support for the Lloyd George coalition meant that from 1916 he proved to be persona non-grata at the club, and this only increased after he left the Liberal Party in 1924. Thus from 1915 to 1940 (with only a brief display in 1923–4), the painting was held by the club in storage. When Churchill became prime minister in May 1940, the club rushed out the painting and put it on display in the main lobby (where it still hangs today). It was bombed after one year, suffering a diagonal gash down the middle. The painting was then painstakingly restored, and Churchill re-unveiled it himself on 22 July 1943, at a ceremony also attended by his wife (a lifelong Liberal), Liberal Leader Sir Archibald Sinclair (a friend and colleague of over 30 years, then serving in Churchill's cabinet), lifelong friend Lady Violet Bonham Carter, Club chairman Lord Meston and cartoonist David Low.

=== Post-war era ===
The fortunes of the NLC have mirrored those of the Liberal Party – as the Liberals declined as a national force in the 1930s, 1940s and 1950s, so did the NLC. However, despite the Liberals' national decline, the NLC remained a focus for debate.

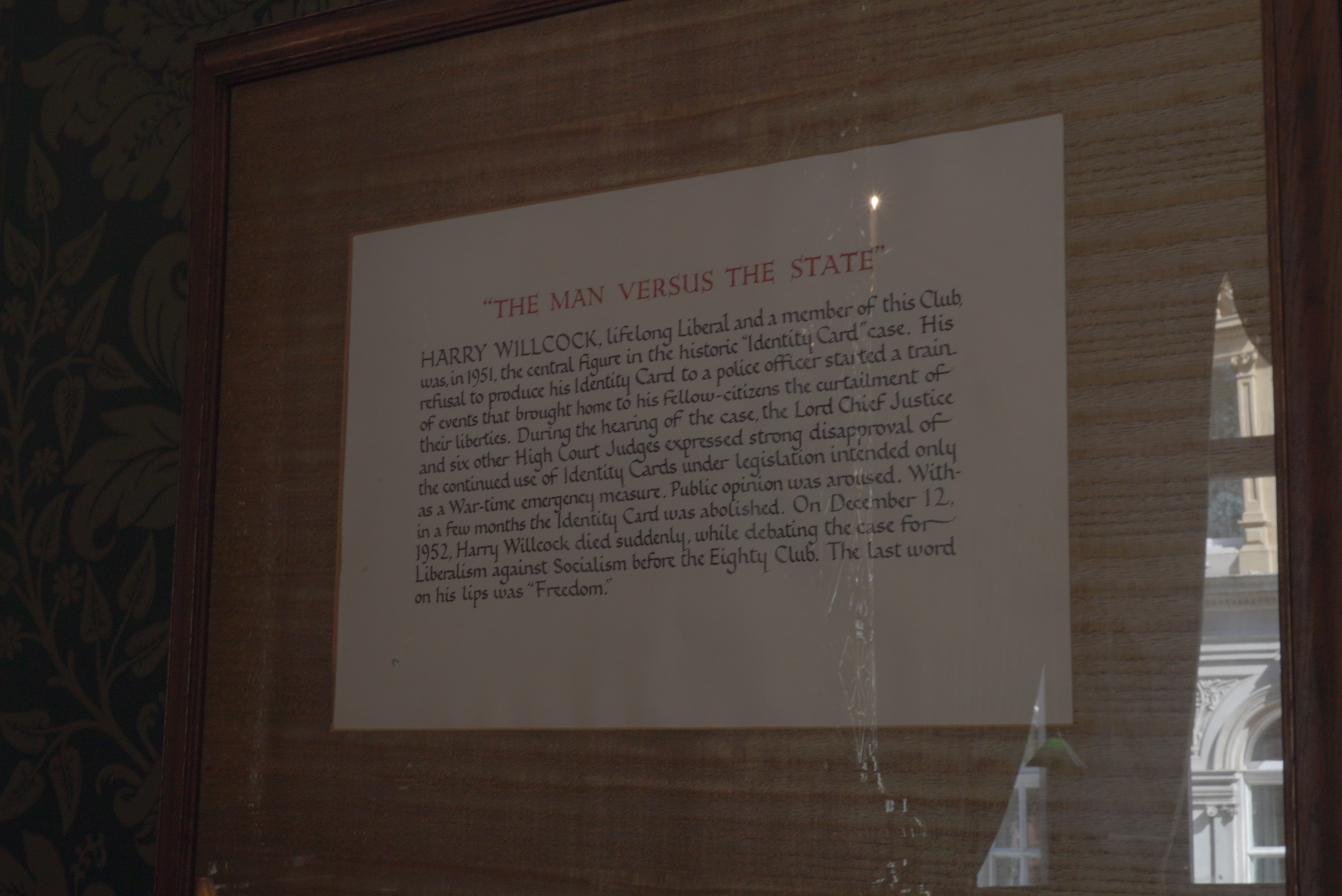
Memorial to Harry Willcock inside the National Liberal Club

In the early 1950s, it was a centre of anti-ID card sentiment, and Harry Willcock, a member who successfully campaigned for the abolition of ID cards, tore his up in front of the club as a publicity stunt in 1951. He subsequently died at a meeting of the Eighty Club during a debate on 12 December 1952, with his last word being "Freedom."

It was at a debate at the club in 1971 that Yale professor James Tobin first publicly voiced his proposal for a Tobin tax on financial transactions.

In addition to the Blitz bombing in 1941, the club also sustained an attack from an IRA bomb at 12 past midnight on 22 December 1973 (as part of a concerted Christmas bombing campaign) which blew open the front door and gashed the duty manager's arm, while on 10 January 1992 an IRA briefcase bomb exploded outside the club, shattering many of its windows.

During the February 1974 general election campaign, Liberal Leader Jeremy Thorpe was defending a wafer-thin majority of 369 votes in his Devon constituency. Instead of fighting a "typical" party leader's election campaign based in London and focusing on the London-based media, Thorpe spent almost the entire election in his constituency, keeping in contact with the national press via a live closed-circuit television link-up to daily press conferences at the National Liberal Club. Thorpe later credited this system with giving him more time to think of answers to questions, and it helped to keep the Liberal campaign both distinctive and modern. Further Liberal election campaigns of the 1970s and 1980s retained the idea of a daily press conference at the NLC, but with live participants rather than a TV link-up to the party leader.

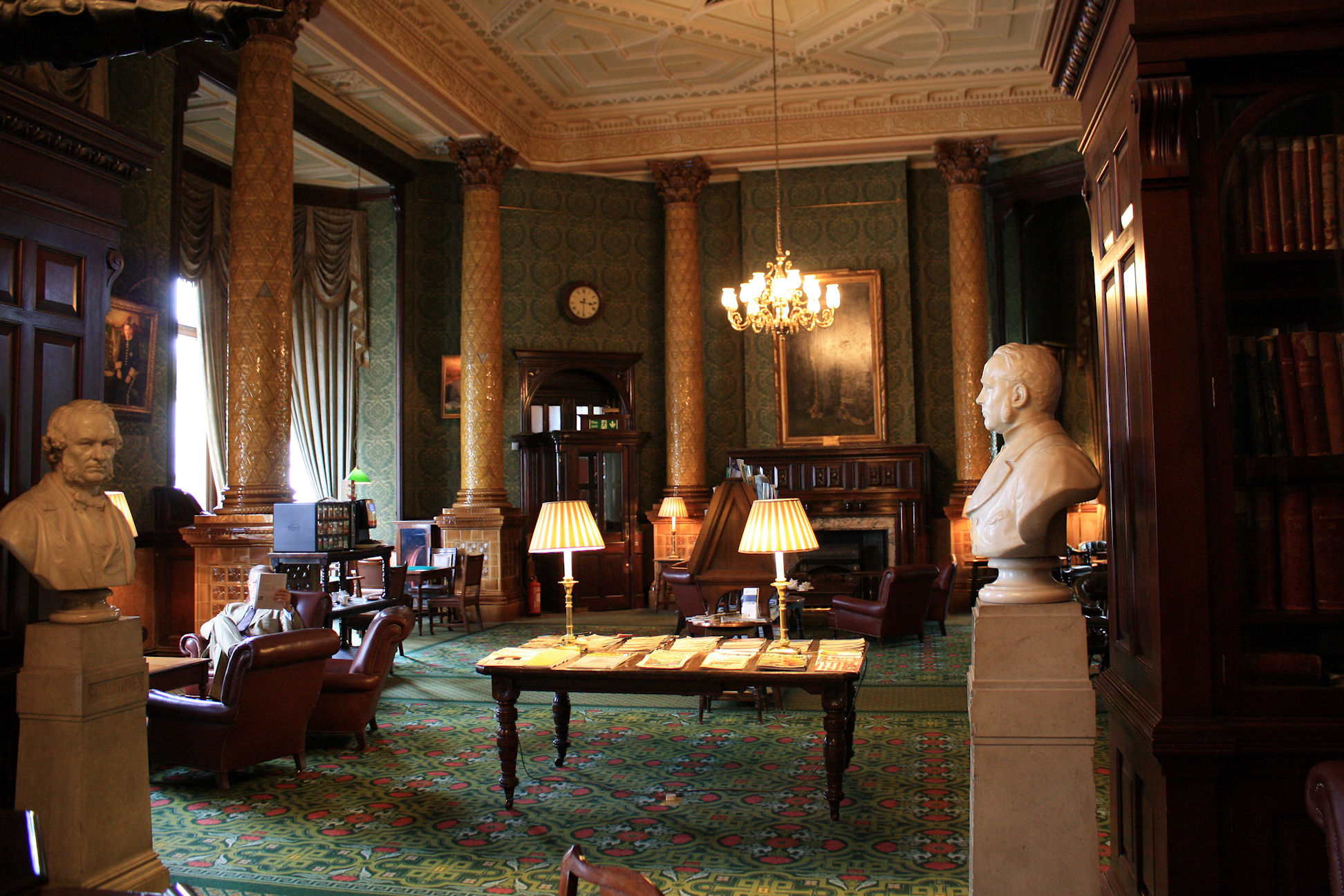
The east end of the smoking room

Throughout the 1960s and 1970s, all London clubs were in serious decline, and the NLC was no exception. By the 1970s the club was in a serious state of disrepair, its membership dwindling, and its finances losing almost a thousand pounds a week. In 1976, Liberal leader Jeremy Thorpe handed over the club to Canadian businessman George Marks, styling himself George de Chabris (and, more improbably, "His Serene Holiness the Prince de Chabris", which he claimed was "a Catholic title"), who, unknown to Thorpe, was a shrewd operator. "De Chabris" claimed to be a multi-millionaire willing to funnel money into the club (although both his wealth and his willingness to finance the club turned out to be untrue), and he spent nine months running the club, relaxing membership rules and bringing in more income, but also moving his family in rent-free, running several businesses from its premises, paying for a sports car and his children's private school fees from the club's accounts, and he eventually left in a hurry owing the club £60,000, (equivalent to £404,307 in 2025) even emptying out the cash till of the day's takings as he went. He eventually agreed to pay back half of that sum in instalments. In his time at the club he also sold it a painting for £10,000, when it was valued at less than £1,000. One of his more controversial reforms was to sell the National Liberal Club's Gladstone Library (which contained the largest library of 17th- to 20th-century political material in the country, including 35,000 books and over 30,000 pamphlets) to the University of Bristol for £40,000. The pretext given was that the club could no longer afford to pay the Librarian's wages, and that it did not want to leave such valuable material unguarded. Ian Bradley described it as "a derisory sum" for the sale, particularly in light of the unique collection of accumulated candidates' manifestos from 19th-century general elections. Until its sale, it had been, as Peter Harris observed, "The most extensive of the Club libraries of London." The collection is still housed at Bristol today. However, the papers referring to the history of the club itself were returned to the NLC in the 1990s, as they had not been included in the sale, and had been sent to Bristol by accident.

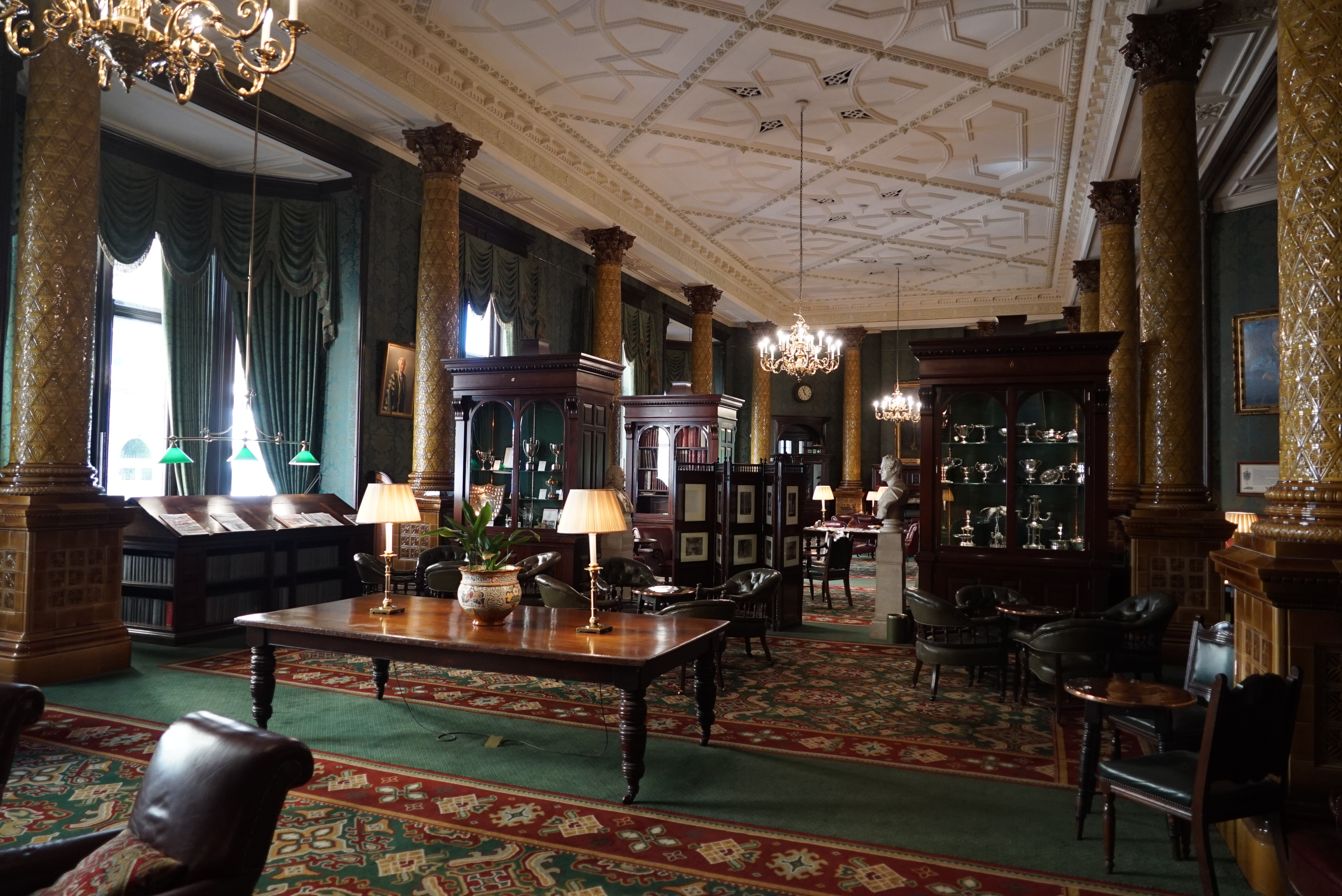
The view from the west end of the smoking room

After the 1977 dismissal of de Chabris, a 1978 rescue package by Sir Lawrence Robson (a former Liberal Party president and parliamentary candidate, co-founder and partner of Robson Rhodes, and husband of Liberal peer Baroness Robson) did much to stabilise the club and secure its future – to this day the club honours Sir Lawrence with a portrait in the smoking room, and one of its function rooms has been renamed the Lawrence Robson Room.

As the Liberal Party's lease on its headquarters expired in 1977, the party organisation moved to the upper floors of the NLC, the negotiations being arranged by "de Chabris". The Liberals occupied a suite of rooms on the second floor, and a series of offices converted from bedrooms on the upper floors. The party continued to operate from the NLC until 1988, when it merged with the Social Democratic Party to form the Liberal Democrats, and moved to occupy the SDP's old headquarters in Cowley Street. During this time, party workers were known to avail themselves of the club downstairs, and the NLC bar became known as the "Liberal Party's 'local'" and a Liberal Party song "Down at the Old NLC" was written in response to this:

Come, come, roll up your trouser leg
Down at the old NLC.
Come, come, stuff your coat on the peg,
Down at the old NLC.
There to get your apron on:
Learn the secret organ song;
Bend your thumb when you shake hands.
Come, come, drinking till the dinner gong,
Down at the old NLC.

— 1985. Words: Mark Tavener. Tune: Down at the Old Bull and Bush

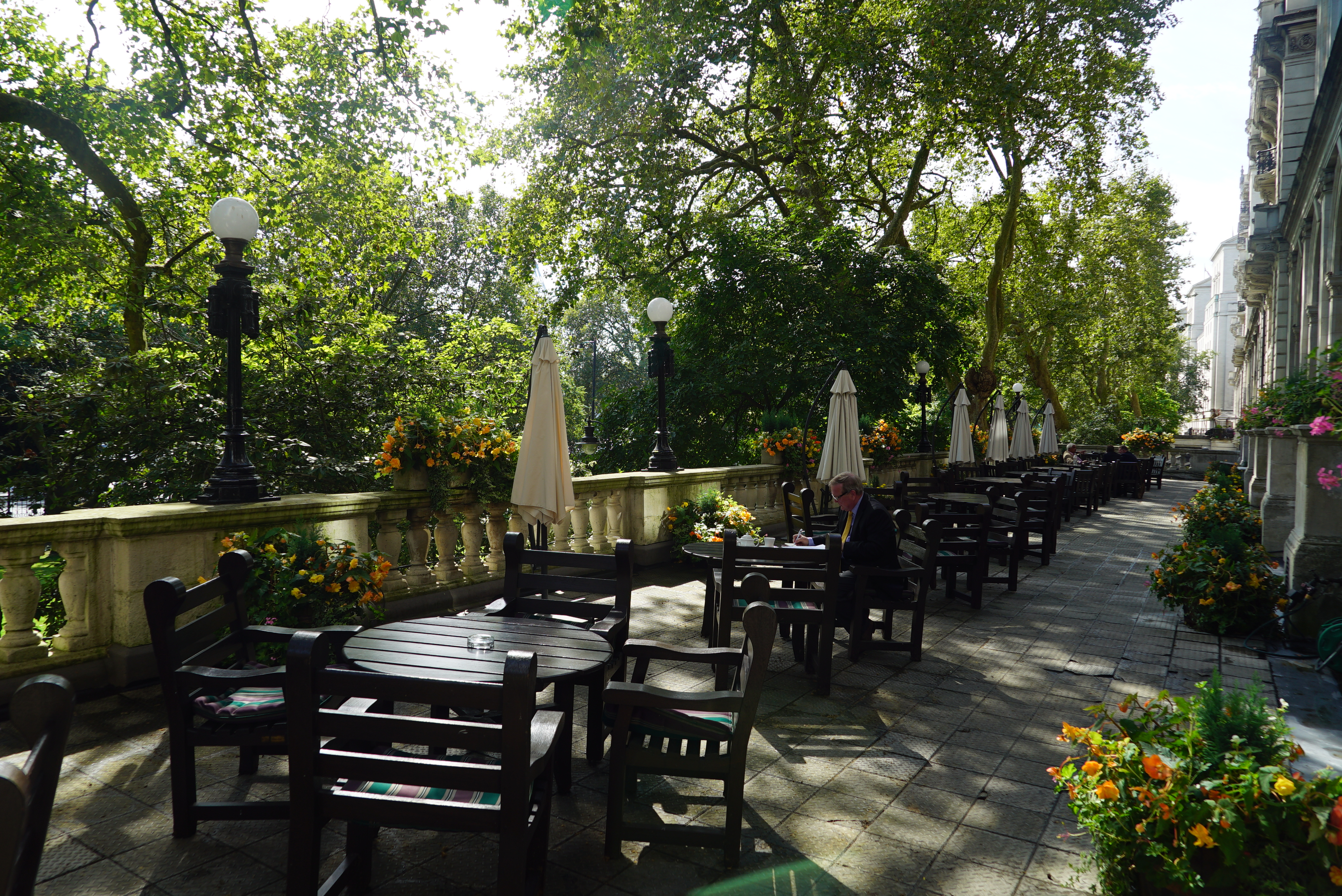
The Terrace

In the autumn of 1980, former Liberal Leader Jo Grimond delivered the inaugural 'Eighty Club' lecture to the Association of Liberal Lawyers at the club, drawing press attention for his scathing criticism of those Liberals who believed that their future lay in some form of social democracy, or what he termed, "a better yesterday".

In 1985, reminiscent of the earlier de Chabris deals, the club undertook a two-year negotiation to sell off its second-floor and basement function rooms, and the 140 bedrooms from the third floor to the eighth floor (including two vast ballrooms and the Gladstone Library, which had contained 35,000 volumes before their sale in 1977, and was standing empty by the 1980s) to the adjoining Royal Horseguards Hotel, which is approached from a different entrance, and which has operated as a hotel since 1971. This was not without some dissent among the membership, but the sale ensured that the club's financial future was secure, and the remaining part of the club still operating, mainly on the ground and first floors of the vast building, still remains one of the largest clubhouses in the world. Originally built for 6,000 members, the club still provides facilities for around 2,000.

The club's calendar includes an Annual Whitebait Supper, where members depart by river from Embankment Pier, downstream to The Trafalgar, the Greenwich tavern which Gladstone used to take his cabinet ministers to by boat; as well as the Political and Economic Circle, which was founded by Gladstone in the 1890s.

On 17 July 2002, Jeremy Paxman conducted a well-publicised interview with Lib Dem leader Charles Kennedy in the club's smoking room for an edition of Newsnight. The interview generated controversy over Paxman's querying Kennedy's alcohol intake, including his asking, "Does it trouble you that every single politician to whom we've spoken in preparing for this interview said the same thing – 'You're interviewing Charles Kennedy, I hope he's sober'?" It was the first time a major television interviewer had raised the topic with the Lib Dem leader, who resigned three and half years later after admitting that he suffered from alcoholism.

In the 2006 Liberal Democrats leadership election, Chris Huhne launched his leadership campaign from the main staircase of the club, while in the 2007 Liberal Democrats leadership election, frontrunner and eventual winner Nick Clegg launched his successful leadership bid from the club's David Lloyd George Room, praising "the elegance of the National Liberal Club". As party leader, Clegg has delivered further landmark addresses at the club, such as his "muscular liberalism" speech of 11 May 2011, marking one year of the Liberal Democrats in power as part of the Conservative-led coalition government.

After the Liberal Democrats' mixed result in the 2017 general election, party leader Tim Farron used the club to give his first major speech, calling on Prime Minister Theresa May to resign after she had lost her majority.

== Clubhouse ==
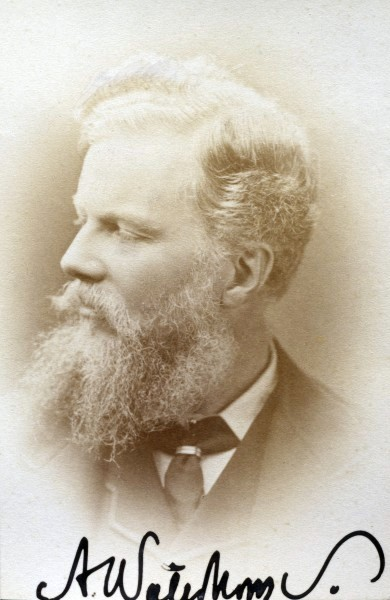
Noted British architect Alfred Waterhouse designed the building.

Designed by leading Victorian architect Alfred Waterhouse using the Renaissance Revival architecture style, the clubhouse was constructed at a cost of some £165,950; a substantial sum in 1884 (equivalent to £17,829,290 in 2025). An earlier design by architect John Carr was rejected by members.

The NLC was described by Munsey's Magazine in 1902 as possessing, "The most imposing clubhouse in the British metropolis", and at the time of its construction, it was the largest clubhouse ever built; only the subsequent Royal Automobile Club building from 1910 was larger. The NLC's building once hosted its own branch of the post office, something which the Royal Automobile Club still does. Waterhouse's design blended French, Gothic and Italianate elements, with heavy use of Victorian Leeds Burmantofts Pottery tilework manufactured by Wilcox and Co. The clubhouse is built around load-bearing steelwork concealed throughout the structure, including steel columns inside the tiled pillars found throughout the club. (It was this resilient structure which enabled the building to survive a direct hit in the Blitz.) Waterhouse's work extended to designing the club's furnishings, down to the dining room chairs.

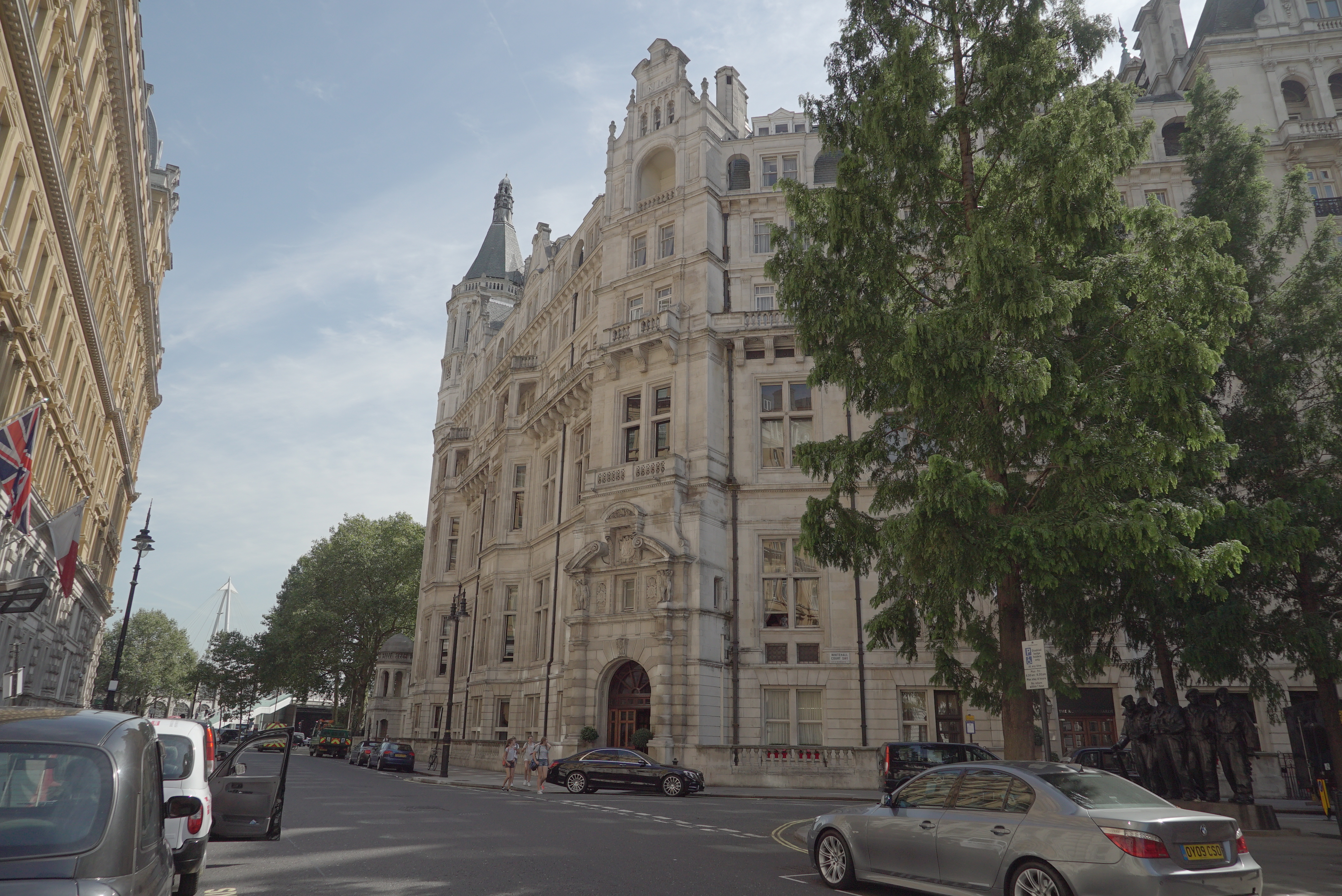
The front entrance, on the building's land-facing side

It was the first London building to incorporate a lift, and the first to be entirely lit throughout by electric lighting. To provide its electricity, the Whitehall Supply Co. Ltd. was incorporated in 1887, being based underneath the club's raised terrace. By the time the supply opened in 1888, it had been bought by the expanding Metropolitan Electricity Supply Co. NLC members were so enamoured with the modern wonder of electric lighting that the original chandeliers featured bare light bulbs, whose distinctive hue was much prized at the time.

The club's wine cellar was converted from a trench dug in 1865, intended to be the Waterloo and Whitehall Railway, stretching from Scotland Yard to Waterloo station, which planned to carry freight that would have been powered by air pressure; digging was abandoned in 1868, and when the company wound up in 1882, the National Liberal Club adapted the tunnel to its present use.

Over the years, numerous Liberal and Liberal Democrat MPs have lived at the club, including David Lloyd George in the 1890s, Cyril Smith in the 1970s and Menzies Campbell in the late 1980s.

== In literature ==
The club has had a number of members who were notable authors, including Rupert Brooke, G. K. Chesterton, Jerome K. Jerome, George Bernard Shaw, Bram Stoker, Dylan Thomas, H. G. Wells and Leonard Woolf; several of whom featured the club in some of their works of literature.

Additionally, the Authors' Club, founded in 1891 in neighbouring Whitehall Court, lodged with the National Liberal Club between 1966 and 1976, and has done so again since 2014.

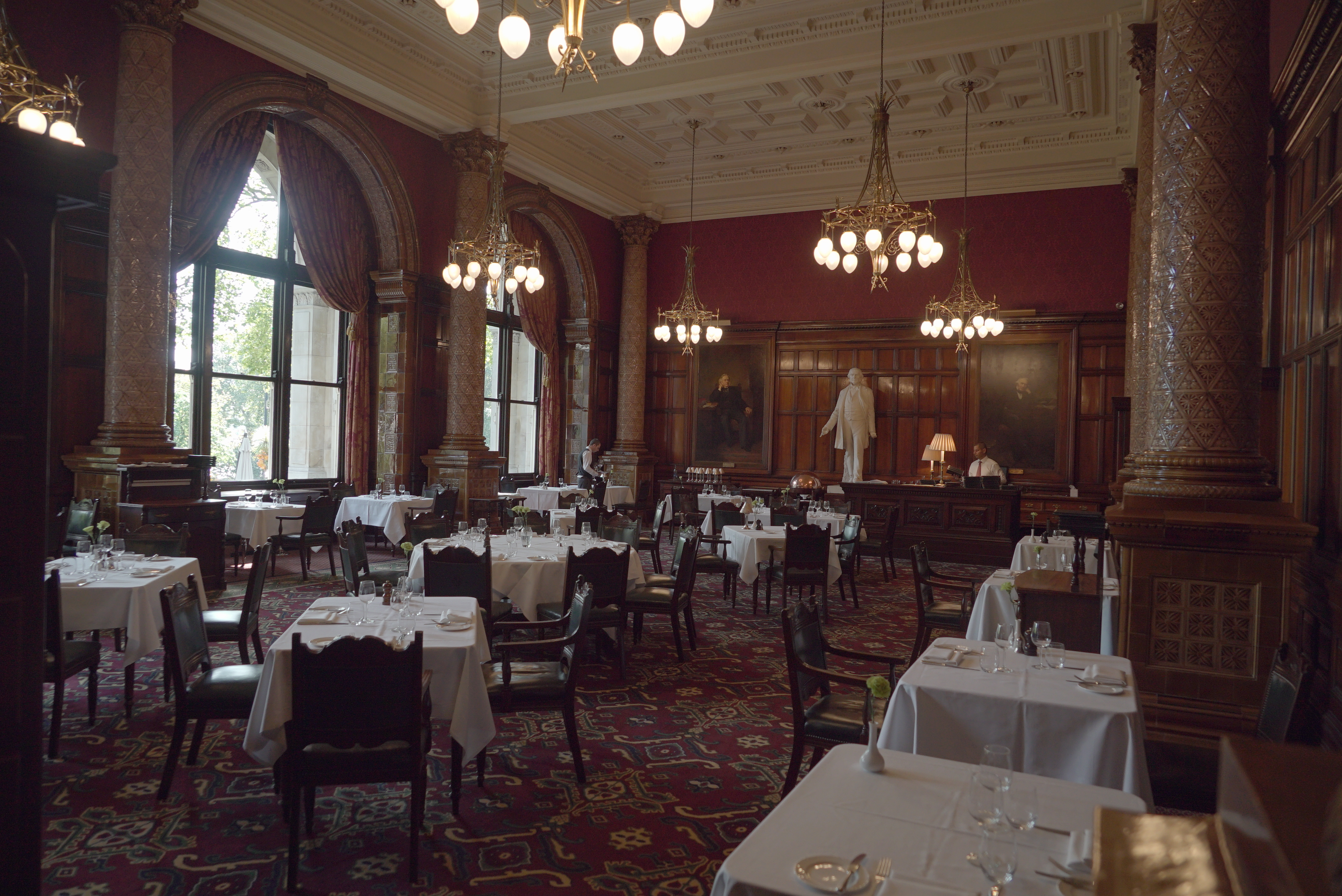
The dining room was described by NLC member H. G. Wells in Tono-Bungay (1909).

- G. K. Chesterton, who was a member, mentions it as a setting in the short story "The Notable Conduct of Professor Chadd" in his collection The Club of Queer Trades (1905), with the narrator having a one-hour conversation on politics and God with a judge he meets on the club's balcony.
- H. G. Wells, who was also a member, referred to the club in one scene of his autobiographical novel Tono-Bungay (1909), in which the narrator George Ponderevo visits the club dining room with his uncle, admiring "the numerous bright-shaded tables ... the shiny ceramic columns and pilasters, [and looked] at the impressive portraits of Liberal statesmen and heroes, and all that contributes to the ensemble of that palatial spectacle."
- H. G. Wells also gave a lengthy description of the NLC in his novel The New Machiavelli (1911), discussing the narrator's experience of visiting the club during the 1906 general election:

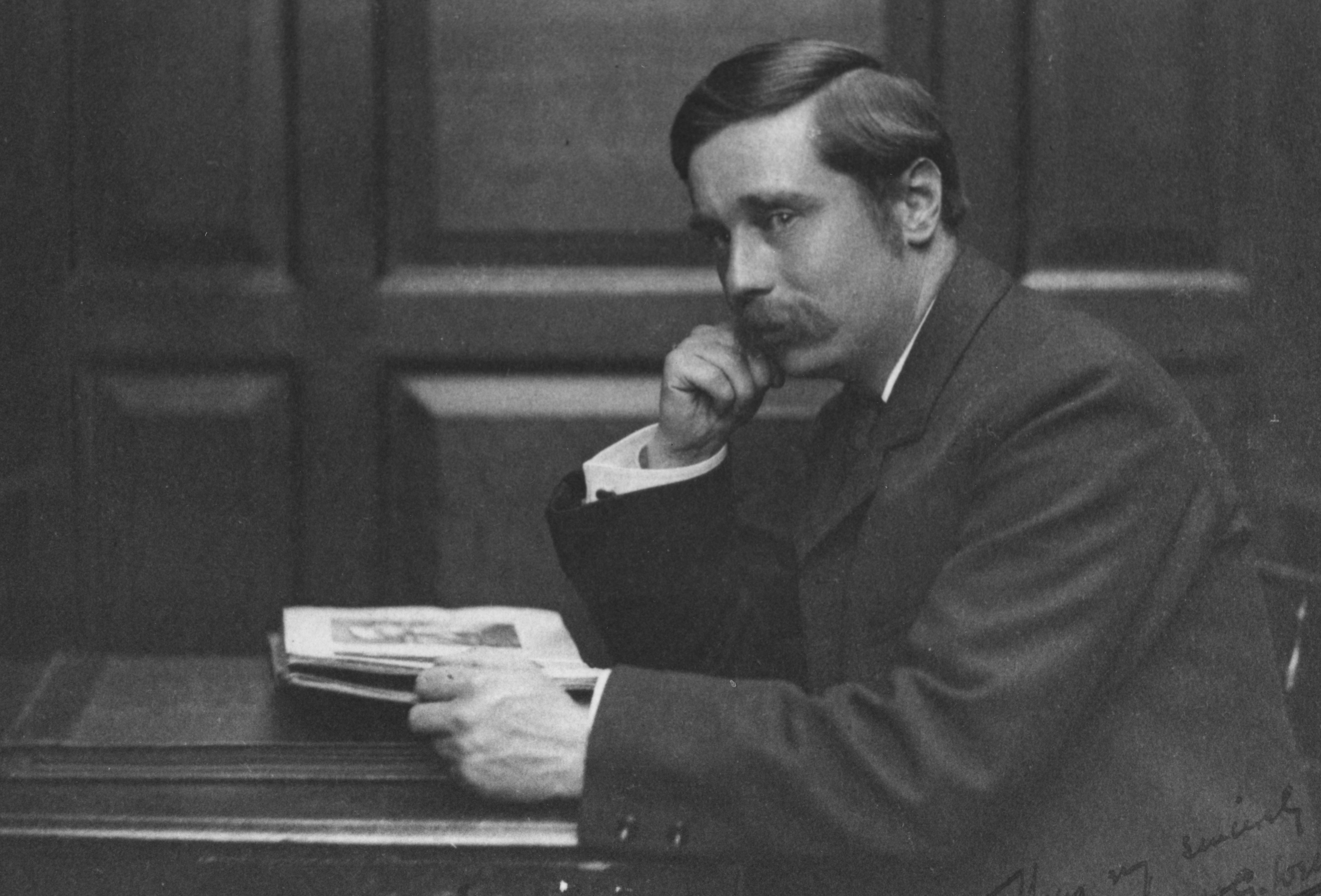
NLC member H. G. Wells painted a vivid, detailed portrait of the club at the time of the Liberal landslide of 1906.

I engaged myself to speak at one or two London meetings, and lunched at the Reform, which was fairly tepid, and dined and spent one or two tumultuous evenings at the National Liberal Club, which was in active eruption. The National Liberal became feverishly congested towards midnight as the results of the counting came dropping in. A big green-baize screen had been fixed up at one end of the large smoking-room with the names of the constituencies that were voting that day, and directly the figures came to hand, up they went, amidst cheers that at last lost their energy through sheer repetition, whenever there was record of a Liberal gain. I don't remember what happened when there was a Liberal loss; I don't think that any were announced while I was there.

How packed and noisy the place was, and what a reek of tobacco and whisky fumes we made! Everybody was excited and talking, making waves of harsh confused sound that beat upon one's ears, and every now and then hoarse voices would shout for someone to speak. Our little set was much in evidence. Both the Cramptons were in, Lewis, Bunting Harblow. We gave brief addresses attuned to this excitement and the late hour, amidst much enthusiasm.

"Now we can DO things!" I said amidst a rapture of applause. Men I did not know from Adam held up glasses and nodded to me in solemn fuddled approval as I came down past them into the crowd again.

Men were betting whether the Unionists would lose more or less than two hundred seats.

"I wonder just what we shall do with it all", I heard one sceptic speculating....

Wells later described the State Opening of the new 1906 parliament:

It is one of my vivid memories from this period, the sudden outbreak of silk hats in the smoking-room of the National Liberal Club. At first I thought there must have been a funeral. Familiar faces that one had grown to know under soft felt hats, under bowlers, under liberal-minded wide brims, and above artistic ties and tweed jackets, suddenly met one, staring with the stern gaze of self-consciousness, from under silk hats of incredible glossiness. There was a disposition to wear the hat much too forward, I thought, for a good Parliamentary style.

About the club more broadly, Wells' narrator reflected:

My discontents with the Liberal party and my mental exploration of the quality of party generally is curiously mixed up with certain impressions of things and people in the National Liberal Club. The National Liberal Club is Liberalism made visible in the flesh—and Doultonware. It is an extraordinary big club done in a bold, wholesale, shiny, marbled style, richly furnished with numerous paintings, steel engravings, busts, and full-length statues of the late Mr. Gladstone; and its spacious dining-rooms, its long, hazy, crowded smoking-room with innumerable little tables and groups of men in armchairs, its magazine room and library upstairs, have just that undistinguished and unconcentrated diversity which is for me the Liberal note. The pensive member sits and hears perplexing dialects and even fragments of foreign speech, and among the clustering masses of less insistent whites his roving eye catches profiles and complexions that send his mind afield to Calcutta or Rangoon or the West Indies or Sierra Leone or the Cape....

I was not infrequently that pensive member. I used to go to the Club to doubt about Liberalism. About two o'clock in the day the great smoking-room is crowded with countless little groups. They sit about small round tables, or in circles of chairs, and the haze of tobacco seems to prolong the great narrow place, with its pillars and bays, to infinity. Some of the groups are big, as many as a dozen men talk in loud tones; some are duologues, and there is always a sprinkling of lonely, dissociated men. At first one gets an impression of men going from group to group and as it were linking them, but as one watches closely one finds that these men just visit three or four groups at the outside, and know nothing of the others. One begins to perceive more and more distinctly that one is dealing with a sort of human mosaic; that each patch in that great place is of a different quality and colour from the next and never to be mixed with it. Most clubs have a common link, a lowest common denominator in the Club Bore, who spares no one, but even the National Liberal bores are specialised and sectional. As one looks round one sees here a clump of men from the North Country or the Potteries, here an island of South London politicians, here a couple of young Jews ascendant from Whitechapel, here a circle of journalists and writers, here a group of Irish politicians, here two East Indians, here a priest or so, here a clump of old-fashioned Protestants, here a little knot of eminent Rationalists indulging in a blasphemous story sotto voce. Next to them are a group of anglicised Germans and highly specialised chess-players, and then two of the oddest-looking persons—bulging with documents and intent upon extraordinary business transactions over long cigars ...

I would listen to a stormy sea of babblement, and try to extract some constructive intimations. Every now and then I got a whiff of politics. It was clear they were against the Lords—against plutocrats—against Cossington's newspapers—against the brewers.... It was tremendously clear what they were against. The trouble was to find out what on earth they were for!...

As I sat and thought, the streaked and mottled pillars and wall, the various views, aspects, and portraits of Mr. and Mrs. Gladstone, the partitions of polished mahogany, the yellow-vested waiters, would dissolve and vanish, and I would have a vision of this sample of miscellaneous men of limited, diverse interests and a universal littleness of imagination enlarged, unlimited, no longer a sample but a community, spreading, stretching out to infinity—all in little groups and duologues and circles, all with their special and narrow concerns, all with their backs to most of the others.

What but a common antagonism would ever keep these multitudes together? I understood why modern electioneering is more than half of it denunciation. Let us condemn, if possible, let us obstruct and deprive, but not let us do. There is no real appeal to the commonplace mind in "Let us do." That calls for the creative imagination, and few have been accustomed to respond to that call. The other merely needs jealousy and bate, of which there are great and easily accessible reservoirs in every human heart.

- Foe-Farrell (1918) by Arthur Quiller-Couch features a scene in which the intoxicated title character is apprehended after a night of drunken excess, and pleads that he is a member of the NLC. The narrator tells him "the National Liberal Club carries its own recommendation. What's more, it's going to be the saving of us...They'll admit you, and that's where you'll sleep to-night. The night porter will hunt out a pair of pyjamas and escort you up the lift. Oh, he's used to it. He gets politicians from Bradford and such places dropping in at all hours. Don't try the marble staircase—it's winding and slippery at the edge."
- The club is referred to in passing in several P. G. Wodehouse stories:

- In a Mulliner tale in the short story collection Young Men in Spats (1936), Mr. Mulliner describes a state of complete pandemonium as being "more like that of Guest Night at the National Liberal Club than anything he had ever encountered."
- In the short story collection Eggs, Beans and Crumpets (1940), Bingo Little makes an ill-considered bet on a horse after a perceived omen: "On the eve of the race he had a nightmare in which he saw his Uncle Wilberforce dancing the rumba in the nude on the steps of the National Liberal Club and, like a silly ass, accepted this as a bit of stable information."
- In the novel The Adventures of Sally (1922), it is said that an uncle of Lancelot "Ginger" Kemp is "a worthy man, highly respected in the National Liberal Club".

- The 1920s-set detective thriller The Blyth House Murder (2011) by Terry Minahan features the club as a setting, with Chapter 8 entitled "Murder at the National Liberal Club."

== Membership ==
The NLC is a private members' club, with membership needing the nomination of an existing member, and a waiting period of at least one month. Members are in one of two categories: either Members, who sign a declaration that they shall not use the club's facilities or their membership for 'political activities adverse to Liberalism', or Political Members, who sign the same declaration, plus an additional declaration that they are a Liberal in their politics, in exchange for additional voting rights within the club. Non-political Membership was first introduced in 1932, to allow Liberals to join when they had been barred up until that point, as several occupations such as judges, army officers and senior civil servants specifically forbade political declarations.

It is currently one of the few London clubs to contain other clubs within. The Authors Club meets and hosts events at the NLC.

In return for a collective subscription, members of the Old Millhillian's Club (OMC) were allowed to use the NLC clubhouse after 1968, when their own neighbouring Whitehall Court clubhouse closed down, until the arrangement was discontinued in the 2010s.

=== Ethnic minority members since the 1880s ===
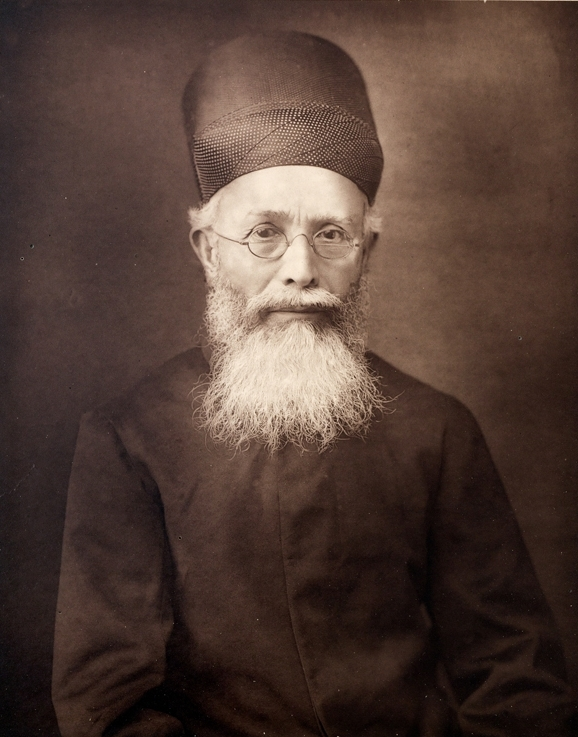
Dadabhai Naoroji, later Britain's first Indian MP, pictured in 1889, when he was a member of the club

In keeping with its liberal roots, it was one of the first London club to invite ethnic minorities as members, and the first to do so from its very foundation. (A handful of other Victorian clubs remained accessible to minority candidates, including the East India Club whose members included the opium trader Sir Jamsetjee Jejeebhoy, but the NLC's ethnic minority members tended to be more radical and anti-imperialist than "establishment" figures such as Jejeebhoy.) The first recorded ethnic minority member of the NLC, Dadabhai Naoroji was admitted in 1885, when the club was less than three years old. Spurred on by club secretary William Digby (himself a long-standing anti-imperialist campaigner), by the late 1880s, the club had cultivated a large overseas and expatriate membership, particularly concentrated in India and among Indian nationals resident in London. Henry Sylvester Williams, the Trinidadian lawyer, pan-Africanist, and Progressive Party Marylebone councillor, was a member, as were Muhammad Ali Jinnah, a successful barrister who went on to be the founder of modern-day Pakistan; C. P. Ramaswami Iyer, the Diwan (prime minister) of Travancore; and Gopal Krishna Gokhale, the Indian independence leader, who mentored the young Mahatma Gandhi - himself an occasional visitor to the club as Gokhale's guest.

=== Women members since the 1960s ===
Since the club's 1882 foundation, women had always been allowed to use the club as visitors, but remained barred from membership until the 1960s, when it became one of the first "gentlemen's clubs" to admit women members. It offered women an 'associate membership' category from 1967 until 1976. The Lady Associate membership referendum was submitted for adoption by the General Committee in June 1967. The first five applications for Lady Associate Members were approved by the Membership Committee in November 1967. "Number of lady associate members elected, or applying, at 19 January 1968" was 34. One of the early Lady Associate Members was Miss. V.E. Wilcox, approved by the Membership Committee in March 1968. Lady Associate members initially had to be the wife or widow of a member of NLC. In 1969, women who were not related by family relationships to a male member could be nominated as Lady Associate Member, paying a higher membership fee to a Lady Associate member who is a wife or widow of a member. Both types of Lady Associate member fees were still lower than male members' membership fees because of restricted privileges of Lady Associate members. Other early Lady Associate members included Violet Bonham Carter and Nancy Seear.

It did not admit women as full members until 1976, although this did still make it the first major London club to admit women, while many other such clubs did not admit women until the 1990s or 2000s (and several still do not). The next major London club to admit women was the Reform Club, in 1981. The club's first full women members in 1976 were Christina Baron and Joyce Arram.

In 2016, the club elected its first female chairman, Janet Berridge.

=== Dress code ===
When the club was originally launched in 1882, like every other London club of the era it had no prescriptive dress code. In 1888, a simple requirement was introduced that "No member shall appear in any public rooms of the Club in a dressing gown, slippers, or other deshabille." Beyond that, the club's only dress code was a request in the Regulations that members "dress and conduct themselves in a manner consistent with civilised standards", but precisely how members chose to observe that remained a matter of considerable personal interpretation. Indeed, the club's first official history, in 1925, noted that an unusual feature of the NLC was the way in which it enjoyed far more casual dress than other London clubs, with members turning up in their working clothes, and it singled out, "the practical tabooing of evening dress, which assisted in securing the attendance of the House of Commons and Press Gallery men for at least part of the social evening."

This absence of any prescriptive dress code remained the club's modus operandi from 1882 until 1979, when the club's flurry of recent scandals led the General Committee to impose a strict jacket-and-tie dress code for men for the very first time, emulating the jacket-and-tie dress codes introduced in other London clubs in the 1950s, which the NLC had previously held out against. No vote of the membership was held on the new dress code. This strict jacket-and-tie dress code remained in place for 40 years after the General Committee's 1979 decision, although a 2005 review led the club to permit men to remove their jackets on the club's terrace.

In May 2018, the club's annual general meeting voted by 49 to 36 in favour of a trial relaxation of the dress code in July and August of that year, removing the jacket-and-tie requirement from every part of the club except the dining room. It was the first time in 39 years that members had been permitted a formal vote on the dress code. At the following AGM in May 2019, the dress code was more permanently relaxed, by 80 votes to 19.

== Film and television appearances ==
The club has been used as a location in numerous films and television programmes, including:

- Look at Life: Members Only (1965) – a two-minute sequence on the NLC as part of this short cinema featurette on London clubs.
- Casino Royale (1967) – a short scene filmed in front of the club's main entrance on Whitehall Place, with Derek Nimmo putting Joanna Pettet into a taxi driven by Bernard Cribbins.
- The Man Who Haunted Himself (1970) – billiards room scene with Roger Moore and Thorley Walters, filmed in the basement ballroom. A later scene filmed in the same room is intercut with footage of Moore in the Reform Club, making it seem as if the room is part of the Reform.
- Zeppelin (1971) – numerous scenes filmed in the Gladstone Library, River Room, Billiards Room and various other areas of the club, all doubling for First World War-era government offices. Ronald Adam plays the unnamed prime minister, with Michael York, Richard Hurndall and Rupert Davies as various army and navy officers.
- The Marty Feldman Comedy Machine (1971) – "Just one more please" sketch in which William Mervyn plays a politician emerging from the club, being chased by Marty Feldman's increasingly frenzied press photographer.
- Savage Messiah (1972) – two scenes of this Ken Russell film, shot in the Gladstone Library (which doubled for the interior of Paris' Bibliothèque Sainte-Geneviève), in which Dorothy Tutin and Scott Antony played the writer Sophie Brzeska and the sculptor Henri Gaudier-Brzeska meeting for the first time.
- The Professionals, episode 2.7, Not a Very Civil Civil Servant (1978) – duelling scene between Gordon Jackson and Lewis Collins, whilst Martin Shaw looks on, filmed in the basement ballroom.
- The Elephant Man (1980) – two scenes in this David Lynch film, both with John Gielgud and Anthony Hopkins. The first was filmed in an unidentified room of the NLC doubling for Gielgud's office, the second in the Gladstone Library doubling as a hospital boardroom.
- Winston Churchill: The Wilderness Years (1981) – Episode 2 – scene filmed in the men's restroom, with Eric Porter and Edward Woodward playing Neville Chamberlain and Samuel Hoare.
- The Missionary (1982) – scene filmed in the basement ballroom, with the room redressed with a boxing ring and climbing frames to look like a sports-themed club, with Michael Palin and Denholm Elliott. There is also an establishing shot of the club's main hall.
- Brazil (1985) – Party scene in this Terry Gilliam film, set in the NLC's main staircase and basement ballroom, the latter having been heavily redressed in Gilliam's trademark style. Jonathan Pryce, Michael Palin, Jim Broadbent, Katherine Helmond, Peter Vaughan, Jack Purvis, Kathryn Pogson and Elizabeth Spender all appear in this scene.
- House of Cards (1990) – Episode 2 – scene filmed in the Gladstone Library, with Kenny Ireland as Benjamin Landless, a thinly veiled spoof of Rupert Murdoch.
- The Russia House (1990) – Potomac-Blair Publishing launch party scene, set in Moscow, filmed in The Reading & Writing Room
- The Wings of the Dove (1997) – establishing shot of the front entrance, followed by a scene filmed in the dining room, with Linus Roache, Alison Elliott, and Elizabeth McGovern.
- Spooks (2002–11) – numerous shots of the smoking room, staircase, main hall and exterior in many episodes, for instance series 05, episode 05, "The Message" (2006), in which Peter Firth and Tim McInnerny lunch at the latter's unnamed club.
- Sparkling Cyanide (2003) – scene filmed in the main staircase, doubling for a barrister's chambers.
- The Alan Clark Diaries (2004) – scene filmed in the dining room, with John Hurt playing Alan Clark.
- Hustle, episode 1.2, Faking It (2004) – exterior scene of the club entrance, with Marc Warren and Robert Pugh.
- The Constant Gardener (2005) – based on the John le Carré novel, with scenes filmed in the main entrance, smoking room and dining room, featuring Ralph Fiennes and Bill Nighy.
- And When Did You Last See Your Father? (2007) – award ceremony scene filmed in the Gladstone Library, with Colin Firth and Jim Broadbent
- Shanghai (2010) – brief scene with John Cusack and David Morse in the smoking room.
- The Hour (2011) – Episode 1 – several scenes in the main hall and the smoking room.
- Dancing on the Edge (2013) – German embassy party scene filmed in the Gladstone Library and the Whitehall Suite
- London Spy (2015) – Episode 3 – scenes filmed outside and in the main entrance hall and smoking room
- Doctor Strange (2016) – scenes of the London Sanctum filmed in the main entrance hall
- The Crown, episode 3.8, Dangling Man (2019) – party scenes filmed in the main entrance hall, staircase and dining room
- Tenet (2020) – scene in Shipley's Auction House

== Notable members ==
Over the years the NLC has contained a large number of notable members. In addition to many politicians, including seven prime ministers – five Liberals from Gladstone to Lloyd George, one Labour (Ramsay MacDonald) and one Conservative (Winston Churchill), its membership has also contained a sizeable literary element, with writers including Rupert Brooke, G. K. Chesterton, John Creasey, Jerome K. Jerome, George Newnes, C. P. Scott, George Bernard Shaw, Bram Stoker, Edgar Wallace, H. G. Wells and Leonard Woolf.

- Charles McLaren, 1st Baron Aberconway, Liberal MP 1880–86, 1892–1910.
- John Hamilton-Gordon, 7th Earl of Aberdeen, Lord-Lieutenant of Ireland 1886 & 1905–15, Governor-general of Canada 1893–98; founder member
- Geoffrey Acland, Chairman of the Liberal Party 1954–56.
- Donald Adamson, author and historian.
- Paul Addison, historian.
- Elkan Nathan Adler, author, lawyer, historian, and noted collector of Jewish books and manuscripts.
- Sir William Agnew, art dealer and Liberal MP 1880–86.
- James Kitson, 1st Baron Airedale, Liberal MP 1892–1907; President of the National Liberal Federation, 1893–90.
- Lord Alderdice, Speaker of the Northern Ireland Assembly 1998–2004
- Abdullah Yusuf Ali, barrister, Islamic scholar, and translator of the Qur'an into English.
- Asaf Ali, Indian pro-independence politician, Indian ambassador to the US 1947–48, Governor of Odisha 1948–52
- Charles Peter Allen, Liberal MP 1900–18.
- Ronald Wilberforce Allen, Liberal MP 1923–24.
- Sir William Allan, Liberal MP 1893–1903.
- William Allen, Liberal MP 1892–1900, National Liberal MP 1931–35.
- James Annand, Scottish newspaper editor, briefly a Liberal MP for 16 days before his death in 1906.
- George Latimer Apperson, Editor of The Antiquary, 1899–1915.
- Robert Applegarth, trade unionist and working class political activist.
- George Campbell, 8th Duke of Argyll, Lord Privy Seal 1852–55, 1859–66 & 1880–81, and secretary of state for India 1868–74
- John Arlott, cricket commentator.
- George Armitstead, 1st Baron Armitstead, Liberal MP, 1868–73 & 1880–86.
- Paddy Ashdown, Baron Ashdown, Leader of the Liberal Democrats 1988–99, Liberal/Lib Dem MP 1983–2001
- Sir Robert Aske, Liberal MP 1923-4 & 1929–45.
- H. H. Asquith, Prime Minister 1908–16, Leader of the Liberal Party 1908–26, Home Secretary 1892–95, Chancellor of the Exchequer 1905–08, Liberal MP 1886–1918 & 1920–24
- David Austick, Liberal MP 1973–74.
- John Lubbock, 1st Baron Avebury, Liberal MP 1870–1900; founder member
- Eric Lubbock, 4th Baron Avebury, Liberal MP 1962–70, Chief Whip of the Liberal Party 1963–70.
- Sir John Baker, Liberal MP 1892–1900 & 1906–09.
- John Arnold Baker, judge and Liberal parliamentary candidate; chairman of the club.
- Joseph Allen Baker, engineer and Liberal MP 1905–18.
- Desmond Banks, Baron Banks, President of the Liberal Party 1968–69; President of the Club
- Sir Godfrey Baring, Liberal MP 1906–18.
- Sir John Barker, Liberal MP 1900–01 & 1906–10.
- Arthur Rhys Barrand, Coalition Liberal MP 1918–22.
- Sir Edmund Broughton Barnard, Liberal MP 1906–10.
- Ernest Belfort Bax, socialist journalist and philosopher
- Thomas Bayley, Liberal MP 1892–1906.
- Catherine Bearder, Lib Dem MEP 2009–present
- Sir Andrew Beattie, Senator of the Parliament of Southern Ireland, 1920–2.
- Sir Leonard Behrens, President of the Liberal Party, 1958–59.
- Sir Alan Beith, Deputy Leader of the Liberal Democrats 1992–2003, Liberal (later Lib Dem) MP 1973–2015; currently president of the club
- Sir Hugh Bell, Mayor of Middlesbrough, 1874, 1883 & 1911.
- Joseph Bell, physician and real-life inspiration for Sherlock Holmes
- Sir William Bellairs, army general.
- David Bellotti, Lib Dem MP 1990–92
- George Jackson Bentham, Liberal MP 1910–18.
- Cornelis Berkhouwer, Dutch Liberal MEP 1963–84, President of the European Parliament 1973–75.
- Sir Charles Bernard, Chief Commissioner of Burma, 1880–83 & 1886–87.
- Sir Thomas Berridge, solicitor and Liberal candidate.
- Charles Albert Berry, nonconformist divine.
- Sir James Berry, surgeon.
- Peter Bessell, Liberal MP 1964–70
- John Bethell, 1st Baron Bethell, banker and Liberal MP 1906–22.
- Alfred Billson, Liberal MP 1892–95, 1897–1900 & 1906–07.
- Sir James Blindell, Liberal and National Liberal MP 1929–37.
- Herbert Mills Birdwood, colonial administrator, acting governor of Bombay in 1895.
- Peter Boizot, Liberal Party candidate, founder of the PizzaExpress chain.
- Joseph Cheney Bolton, Liberal MP 1880–92.
- The Rt Hon Charles Booth, philanthropist and shipowner
- William Copeland Borlase, Liberal MP 1880–87; founder member
- Bhupendra Nath Bose, President of the Indian National Congress, 1914.
- Sharon Bowles, Baroness Bowles, Lib Dem MEP 2005–14 and peer.
- Laurence George Bowman, Liberal candidate and Headmaster of the Jews Free School, 1908–30.
- Arthur Boyer, Canadian Liberal senator, 1909–22.
- Charles Bradlaugh – see "Notable rejections" below.
- William Bradshaw, Baron Bradshaw, Lib Dem peer and academic
- Thomas Bramsdon, Liberal MP 1900, 1906–10, 1918–22 & 1923–4.
- Thomas Brassey, 1st Earl Brassey, Liberal MP 1865 & 1868–86, Governor of Victoria, Australia 1895–1900; founder member
- Gavin Campbell, 1st Marquess of Breadalbane, Liberal Whip in the Lords, 1873–95.
- Frank Briant, Liberal MP 1918–29 & 1931–34.
- Sir John Brigg, Liberal MP 1895–1911.
- Jacob Bright, Liberal MP 1867–74, 1876–85 & 1885–95; founder member.
- George Bryant Britton, Coalition Liberal MP 1918–22.
- Henry Broadhurst, trade unionist and Lib-Lab MP 1880–92, 1894–1906.
- William Brocklehurst Brocklehurst, Liberal MP 1906–18.
- Rupert Brooke, poet
- Stopford Brooke, Liberal MP 1906–10.
- Ernest Brown, Leader of the National Liberal party 1940–45, Liberal (later National Liberal) MP 1923–24 & 1927–45
- Sir John Brunner, 1st Baronet, industrialist and Liberal MP 1885–86, 1887–1910, and President of the National Liberal Federation 1911–8.
- Sir John Brunner, 2nd Baronet, Liberal MP 1906–18 & 1923–24.
- James Bryce, 1st Viscount Bryce, Oxford Regius Professor of Civil Law 1870–93, President of the Board of Trade 1894–95, Chief Secretary for Ireland 1905–07, Liberal MP 1880–1907; founder member
- Abel Buckley, cotton manufacturer and Liberal MP 1885–86.
- Sir Percy William Bunting, Editor of The Contemporary Review, 1882–1911, Editor of the Methodist Times, 1902–1907.
- Leslie Burgin, Liberal and Liberal National MP 1929–45, Minister of Transport, 1937–39, Minister of Supply, 1939–40.
- James Burnie, businessman and Liberal MP 1922–24.
- John Burns, Liberal MP 1892–1918, President of the Local Government Board 1905–14, President of the Board of Trade 1914
- Thomas Burt, trade unionist, Liberal MP 1874–1918, and one of the first working-class MPs.
- Sir William Pollard Byles, owner of the Yorkshire Observer and Liberal MP 1892–95 & 1906–17.
- William Sproston Caine, Temperance advocate and Liberal MP 1880–85, 1886–90, 1892–95 & 1900–03.
- James Caldwell, Liberal Unionist (later Liberal) MP 1886–92 & 1892–1910.
- Patsy Calton, Lib Dem MP 2001–5.
- Sir Menzies Campbell, Leader of the Liberal Democrats 2006–07, Liberal (later Lib Dem) MP 1987–2015
- Sir Henry Campbell-Bannerman, Prime Minister 1905–08, Leader of the Liberal Party 1899–1908, Chief Secretary for Ireland 1884–85, Secretary of State for War 1886 & 1892–95, Liberal MP 1868–1908
- Alan Campbell Johnson, author, journalist, public relations consultant and Liberal candidate.
- Neville Cardus, cricket writer.
- Rupert Carington, 4th Baron Carrington, Liberal MP 1880–85
- Andrew Carnegie, industrialist and philanthropist, calls for whose expulsion as a member followed the 1892 Homestead Strike
- Cyril Carr, Chairman of the Liberal Party, 1972–73, Leader of Liverpool City Council 1974–75.
- Mark Bonham Carter, Liberal MP 1958–59, publisher
- Violet Bonham Carter, Liberal activist and daughter of H. H. Asquith.
- Sir George Catlin, political scientist and philosopher.
- Richard Causton, Liberal MP 1880–85 & 1888–1910.
- Samuel Chadwick, Wesleyan Methodist minister, Editor of the Joyful News, and Principal of Cliff College.
- Henry Chancellor, Liberal MP 1910–18.
- Andy Chande, Tanzanian businessman.
- Francis Channing, 1st Baron Channing of Wellingborough, Liberal MP 1885–1910.
- Sir Mahadev Bhaskar Chaubal, Indian civil servant.
- Walter Butler Cheadle, paediatrician.
- G. K. Chesterton, novelist, poet and playwright.
- Sir R. K. Shanmukham Chetty, Indian lawyer, economist and Finance Minister 1947–49.
- David Chidgey, Baron Chidgey, Lib Dem MP 1994–2005
- Gavin Brown Clark, Liberal MP 1885–1900.
- Sir Andrew Clarke, army general, Governor of the Straits Settlements 1874–75.
- Charles Goddard Clarke, Liberal MP 1906–8.
- Peter William Clayden, Liberal nonconformist journalist and author.
- Nick Clegg, Leader of the Liberal Democrats 2007–2015, Deputy Prime Minister 2010–2015, Lib Dem MEP 1999–2004, Lib Dem MP 2005–17.
- John Clifford, nonconformist minister.
- Edward Treacher Collins, surgeon and ophthalmologist.
- Sir Stephen Collins, Liberal MP 1906–18.
- Sir Jeremiah Colman, industrialist and founder of Colman's Mustard.
- John Colville, Liberal MP 1895–1901.
- Joseph Compton-Rickett, Paymaster-General 1916–19, Liberal MP 1895–1919.
- Arthur Comyns Carr, Liberal MP 1923–24, President of the Liberal Party 1958–59.
- Charles Conybeare, barrister and Liberal MP 1885–95.
- Edward Tyas Cook, journalist, biographer and newspaper editor.
- John Cory, ship owner and coal owner.
- Leonard Costello, barrister, soldier, judge and Liberal MP 1923–4.
- Henry John Stedman Cotton, Indian civil servant, Chief Commissioner of Assam 1896–1902, Liberal MP 1906–10.
- Dugald Cowan, Liberal MP 1918–34.
- Horace Crawfurd, Liberal MP 1924–9.
- Eliot Crawshay-Williams, Liberal MP 1910–13.
- John Creasey, crime and science fiction writer.
- James Creelman, sensationalist reporter.
- Sir Randal Cremer, pacifist and Liberal MP 1885–95 & 1900–08.
- Frank Crisp, solicitor and microscopist.
- Robert Crewe-Milnes, 1st Marquess of Crewe, Lord-Lieutenant of Ireland 1892–95, Leader of the House of Lords 1908–16, Colonial Secretary 1908–10, Secretary of State for India 1910–15, Secretary of State for War 1931.
- Sir William Crossley, Liberal MP 1906–10.
- Bobby Cummines, Chief Executive of UNLOCK, former bank robber, contract killer & racketeer.
- Thomas Curran, Irish Nationalist MP 1892–1900.
- Aaron Curry, Liberal MP 1931–35.
- Prof. John Curtice, psephologist.
- Hugh Dalton, Labour chancellor of the exchequer 1945–47, Labour MP 1924–31 & 1935–59
- Sunanda K. Datta-Ray, journalist and Editor of The Statesman of Calcutta and New Delhi
- Clement Davies, Leader of the Liberal Party 1945–56, Liberal MP 1929–62; Vice-president of the Club
- Joseph Devlin, Irish Nationalist MP 1902–22.
- Campbell Douglas, architect.
- Baron de Forest, Liberal MP 1911–18
- Edward Stanley, 15th Earl of Derby, Conservative MP 1848–69, Conservative Foreign Secretary 1866–68 & 1874–78, Liberal Colonial Secretary 1882–85; founder member
- Joseph Devlin, Irish Nationalist MP 1902–22 & 1929–34
- Sir Charles Dilke, President of the Local Government Board 1882–85, Liberal MP 1868–86 & 1892–1911
- Richard Dimbleby, journalist and broadcaster
- Oscar Eckenstein, mountaineer
- Hugh Emlyn-Jones, judge and Liberal candidate
- Abraham England, businessman, soldier and Liberal MP 1922–31
- Sir Walter Essex, businessman and Liberal MP 1906–18
- George Esslemont, Liberal MP 1907–17
- Stuart Etherington, Chief Executive of the National Council for Voluntary Organisations 1994–present
- Gruffydd Evans, Baron Evans of Claughton, solicitor, and President of the Liberal Party 1977–78
- Owen Evans, Liberal MP 1932–45
- Emlyn Garner Evans, National Liberal MP 1950–59
- Richard Thomas Evans, Liberal MP 1931–35
- Sydney Evershed, brewer and Liberal MP 1886–1900
- George Shaw-Lefevre, 1st Baron Eversley, Parliamentary Secretary to the Board of Trade 1868–71, Parliamentary Secretary to the Admiralty 1871–74 & 1880, First Commissioner of Works 1881–4 & 1892–4, Postmaster-General 1884–5, President of the Local Government Board, 1894–95, Liberal MP 1863–85 & 1886–95
- Lord Ezra, Chairman of the National Coal Board 1971–81, Liberal/Lib Dem peer
- George Henry Faber, insurance underwriter and Liberal MP 1906–10
- Thomas Farrer, 1st Baron Farrer, civil servant, statistician and Liberal peer
- Thomas Farrer, 2nd Baron Farrer, Liberal peer
- Charles Ryle Fay, economic historian and advocate of co-operativism and women's rights
- Lord Fearn, Lib Dem MP 1987–92 & 1997–2001
- John Manger Fells, accountant and developer of cost accounting
- Thomas Ferens, industrialist, philanthropist and Liberal MP 1906–16
- Sir Marcus Fernando, pre-independence Ceylonese statesmen, physician and banker
- Peter Ffrench, Irish Nationalist MP, 1893–1918
- Victor Harold Finney, senior Rank Organisation executive, and Liberal MP 1923–24
- Joseph Firth Bottomley Firth, barrister and Liberal MP 1880–85 & 1888–89; founder member
- Hedley Fitton, engraver and printmaker
- Banister Fletcher, architect, surveyor and Liberal MP 1885–86
- Isaac Foot, Liberal MP 1922–24 & 1929–35
- Prof Carey Foster, chemist and physicist
- Philip Fothergill, woollen manufacturer, President of the Liberal Party 1950–52, Chairman of the Liberal Party 1946–49 & 1952–54, Treasurer of the Liberal Party 1955–59
- Matthew Fowler, Liberal MP 1892–98
- Sir Leonard Benjamin Franklin, barrister, banker and Liberal MP 1923–24
- Sir Edward Fraser, Mayor of Nottingham 1896–99
- Harold Frederic, American journalist and novelist
- Jonathan Fryer, writer, broadcaster and Liberal/Lib Dem politician
- George Fuller, Liberal MP 1885–95
- Hugh Fullerton, merchant and Liberal MP 1906–10
- Air Marshal Lord Garden, Lib Dem peer, RAF officer and academic; vice-chairman of the club at the time of his death
- Tim Garden, Air Marshal Baron Prof Garden, RAF officer and Lib Dem peer; former vice-chairman of the NLC
- Baroness Garden, Lib Dem peer
- James Gardiner, farmer and Liberal MP 1918–23
- David Lloyd George, Prime Minister 1916–22, Leader of the Liberal Party 1926–31, President of the Board of Trade 1905–08, Chancellor of the Exchequer 1908–15, Minister of Munitions 1915–16, Secretary of State for War 1916, Liberal MP 1890–1945
- Henry George, politician, writer and political economist; elected as a Temporary Member of the NLC in 1888–89
- James Gibb, Liberal MP 1906–10
- Sir James Gibson, Lord Provost of Edinburgh 1906–09, Liberal MP 1909–12
- James Daniel Gilbert, banker, merchant and Liberal MP 1916–24
- Harry Gilpin, businessman, Liberal candidate and Chairman of the Liberal Party 1943–46
- Christian David Ginsburg, Polish-born Biblical scholar
- Padamji Ginwala, Indian barrister and economist
- Henry Gladstone, 1st Baron Gladstone of Hawarden, businessman and president of the club 1932–35
- Herbert Gladstone, Liberal MP 1880–1910, Home Secretary 1905–10, Governor-general of South Africa 1910–14; founder member
- William Ewart Gladstone, Prime Minister 1868–74, 1880–85, 1886 & 1892–94, Leader of the Liberal Party 1866–75 & 1880–94, Chancellor of the Exchequer 1852–55, 1859–66, 1873–74 & 1880–82, Tory (later Peelite, later Liberal) MP 1832–45, 1847–95; founder member and first president of the club
- John Jones Jenkins, 1st Baron Glantawe, tin-plate manufacturer and Liberal MP 1882–86 & 1895–1900
- Harold Glanville, President of the Liberal Party, 1959–60
- Alec Ewart Glassey, Liberal MP 1929–31
- Sir Thomas Glen-Coats, businessman and Liberal MP 1906–10
- Robert Glendinning, Liberal (Russellite Unionist) MP 1906–10
- Sir William Samuel Glyn-Jones, pharmacist and Liberal MP 1910–18
- Sir Daniel Ford Goddard, civil engineer, businessman and Liberal MP 1895–1918
- Eric Porter Goff, Provost of Portsmouth 1939–72
- Gopal Krishna Gokhale, founder of the Indian Independence Movement, who invited Mahatma Gandhi to the club as a guest in 1914
- Douglas Goldring, writer and journalist
- Sir Oliver Goonetilleke, Governor-general of Ceylon 1954–62, first Ceylonese individual to hold the post, and a key figure in Sri Lankan independence
- Neville Gorton, Bishop of Coventry 1943–52
- Francis Carruthers Gould, cartoonist
- Edward Temperley Gourley, coal fitter, ship owner and Liberal MP 1868–1900
- Granville Leveson-Gower, 2nd Earl Granville, Leader of Liberal Party 1875–80, Foreign Secretary 1851–52, 1870–74, 1880–85; presided over the club's inaugural dinner in 1882
- Sir David Graaff, South African cold storage magnate and politician; Finance Minister of South Africa, 1915–16
- Corrie Grant, journalist, barrister and Liberal MP 1900–10
- John George Graves, entrepreneur and philanthropist
- Hamar Greenwood, last ever Chief Secretary for Ireland 1920–22, Liberal (later Conservative) MP 1906–22 & 1924–29
- Milner Gray, Liberal MP 1929–31, Chairman of the National Liberal Federation 1934–36, Chairman of the Liberal party 1936–46
- Charles Wilton Wood Greenidge, anti-slavery campaigner
- Thomas Greenwood, publisher and advocate of public libraries
- Edward Grey, 1st Viscount Grey of Fallodon, Foreign Secretary 1905–16, Liberal MP 1885–1916
- George Charles Grey, Liberal MP 1941–44
- Sir Ellis Ellis-Griffith, barrister, Under-Secretary of State for the Home Department 1912–15, and Liberal MP 1895–1918 & 1923-4
- Frank Kingsley Griffith, barrister, judge and Liberal MP 1928–40
- Jo Grimond, Leader of the Liberal Party 1956–67 & 1976, Liberal MP 1950–83; served on the club's general committee in the early 1950s
- Frederick Edward Guest, Chief Whip of the Coalition Liberal party 1917–21, secretary of state for air 1921–22, Liberal (later Conservative) MP 1910–22, 1923–29 & 1931–37
- John Gulland, Liberal chief whip 1915–19, Parliamentary Secretary to the Treasury 1915–19, Liberal MP 1906–18
- Sir Krishna Govinda Gupta, Indian statesman, barrister, Bengali social reformer and leading figure in the Brahmo Samaj movement
- John Winthrop Hackett, Australian newspaper proprietor, politician, and chancellor of the University of Western Australia, 1912–16
- Richard Haldane, 1st Viscount Haldane, Secretary of State for War 1905–12, Lord Chancellor 1912–15 & (as Labour) 1924, Labour Leader of the House of Lords 1924, Liberal MP 1885–1911
- Frederic M. Halford, angler and fly-fishing author who published under the pseudonym "Detached Badger"
- Ronald Acott Hall, diplomat, writer and Liberal candidate
- John Hammond, Irish Nationalist MP, 1891–1908
- Sir Thomas Hanbury, businessman, botanist and philanthropist
- Sir Arthur Harbord, Liberal (later Liberal National) MP 1922–24 & 1929–41
- Henry Harcourt, British barrister, Indian civil servant and Liberal candidate
- Lewis Harcourt, Secretary of State for the Colonies 1910–15, Liberal MP 1904–16
- Sir William Harcourt, Home Secretary 1880–85, Chancellor of the Exchequer 1886 & 1892–95, Leader of the Liberal Party 1896–98, Liberal MP 1868–1904. Just days before his death, Harcourt dined at the club and declared "This is my last public appearance", which it proved to be.
- George Hardy, businessman and Liberal MP 1906–10
- Sir John Hobbis Harris, missionary, anti-slavery campaigner and Liberal MP 1923–24
- Charles Harrison, Liberal MP 1895–97
- Frederic Harrison, Radical jurist and historian
- Ernest Hart, medical journalist, Editor of the British Medical Journal 1866–69 & 1871–98
- Sir Israel Hart, merchant and Liberal candidate
- Edmund Harvey, social reformer, museum curator, and Liberal (later Independent Progressive) MP 1910–18, 1923–24 & 1937–45
- W. E. Harvey, coal miner, trade unionist and Lib-Lab MP 1907–14
- Lewis Haslam, Liberal MP 1906–22
- Arthur Hayter, 1st Baron Haversham, Financial Secretary to the War Office 1882–85, and Liberal MP 1865–68, 1873–85, 1893–95 & 1900–06
- Prof F. R. G. Heaf, physician
- Sir Arthur Haworth, Liberal MP 1906–12
- Charles Hemphill, 1st Baron Hemphill, barrister, Solicitor General for Ireland 1892–95, and Liberal MP 1895–1906
- Stanhope Hemphill, 2nd Baron Hemphill, Liberal MP
- Jean Henderson, barrister and Liberal candidate
- Sir William Henderson, merchant and philanthropist
- Charles Solomon Henry, Australian businessman and British Liberal MP 1906–19
- Arnold Herbert, barrister and Liberal MP 1906–10
- Farrer Herschell, 1st Baron Herschell, Liberal MP 1874–1885, Lord Chancellor 1886 & 1892–95; founder member
- John Sharp Higham, cotton manufacturer and Liberal MP 1904–18
- Sir James Hill, Liberal MP 1916–18
- Levi Hill, trade unionist, first general secretary of the National Association of Local Government Officers, 1909–43
- Albert Ernest Hillary, chocolate manufacturer and Liberal MP 1922–24
- John Hinds, businessman, Liberal MP 1910–18, and Chairman of the Welsh Liberal Federation 1925–28
- Francis Wrigley Hirst, journalist, writer and Editor of The Economist 1907–16
- Sir Robert Hobart, Liberal MP 1906–10
- Leonard Hobhouse, political theorist, sociologist, early proponent of social liberalism
- David Cleghorn Hogg, businessman and Liberal MP 1913–14
- Angus Holden, 1st Baron Holden, Liberal MP 1885–86 & 1892–1900
- Sir Edward Holden, banker, Chairman of the City Bank (and from 1908 its successor, the Midland Bank) 1898–1919, and Liberal MP 1906–10
- Sir Herbert Holdsworth, businessman and Liberal MP 1931–45
- George Holyoake, secularist and supporter of workers' co-operatives; made an honorary member of the club in 1893
- Mary Honeyball, Labour MEP 2000–present
- Arthur George Hooper, Liberal MP 1906–10
- Anthony Hope, author, best known for The Prisoner of Zenda
- Prof R. J. Hopper, archaeologist and historian of Ancient Greece
- Frederic Horne, farmer and Liberal candidate
- Frederick John Horniman, tea trader, Liberal MP 1895–1906 and founder of the Horniman Museum
- Sir John Cousin Horsfall, worsted spinner, banker and Chairman of the West Riding of Yorkshire County Council
- Prof Sir Victor Horsley, surgeon, scientist and suffragist
- Rev Lynn H. Hough, American Methodist clergyman
- Sir Ebenezer Howard, founder of the garden city movement
- Spencer Leigh Hughes, engineer, journalist and Liberal MP 1910–20
- Chris Huhne, Secretary of State for Energy and Climate Change 2010–12, Lib Dem MEP 1999–2005, Lib Dem MP 2005–2013
- Arthur Humphreys-Owen, barrister, landowner and Liberal MP 1894–1906
- Joseph Hunter, Liberal MP 1929–35
- Arthur Wollaston Hutton, clergyman and author; former Librarian of the Club
- Thomas Howell Williams Idris chemical manufacturer and Liberal MP, 1906–10
- Walter Foster, 1st Baron Ilkeston, physician, Liberal MP 1885-6 & 1887–1910, and Parliamentary Secretary to the Local Government Board, 1892–1895
- Rufus Isaacs, Lord Chief Justice 1913–21, Viceroy of India 1921–25, Foreign Secretary 1931, Liberal MP 1904–13
- Prof Daphne Jackson, nuclear physicist
- Thomas Owen Jacobsen, businessman and Liberal MP
- Sir James Alfred Jacoby, lace manufacturer and Liberal MP, 1885–1909
- Henry James, 1st Baron James of Hereford, Liberal (later Liberal Unionist) MP 1869–95, Chancellor of the Duchy of Lancaster 1895–1902; founder member
- M. R. Jayakar, first Vice-Chancellor of the University of Poona
- Sir Alexander Jeans, founder and managing Editor, Liverpool Post and Mercury
- Roy Jenkins, Labour chancellor of the exchequer 1967–70, Labour home secretary 1965–67 & 1974–76, founder and Leader of the Social Democratic Party
- Jerome K. Jerome, author and humourist
- Dame Penelope Jessel, President of the Women's Liberal Federation, 1970–72
- Muhammed Ali Jinnah, founder of Pakistan
- William Johnson, coal miner, trade unionist and Lib-Lab MP, 1906–18
- Joseph Johnstone, Liberal MP, 1918–22
- James Joicey, 1st Baron Joicey, coal mining magnate and Liberal MP, 1885–1906
- Evan Rowland Jones, Liberal MP, 1892–95
- John Daniel Jones, Welsh Congregational minister
- Rev Josiah Towyn Jones, Welsh clergyman and Liberal MP, 1912–22
- Sir Lewis Jones, Liberal National MP, 1931–45
- Lord Jones of Cheltenham Lib Dem MP 1992–2005
- Lakshman Kadirgamar, Sri Lankan lawyer and statesman, Minister of Foreign Affairs of Sri Lanka, 1994–2001 & 2004–05
- John Seymour Keay, businessman and Liberal MP, 1889–95
- Sir Thomas Keens, Liberal MP, 1923–24
- Paul Keetch Lib Dem MP 1997–2010
- Prof Bryan Keith-Lucas, political scientist
- Sir George William Kekewich, civil servant and Liberal MP 1906–10
- The Rt Rev Eric Kemp, Bishop of Chichester 1974–2001; President of the Club
- Charles Kennedy, Leader of the Liberal Democrats 1999–2006, SDP/Lib Dem MP 1983–2015
- Vincent Kennedy, Liberal MP, 1904–18
- J. E. Kenny, Irish Nationalist MP, 1885–96
- William Edwardes, 4th Baron Kensington, Liberal Whip 1880–85 & 1892–95; founder member
- Benjamin Kidd, sociologist.
- James Kiley, Liberal MP, 1916–22
- John Wodehouse, 1st Earl of Kimberley, Colonial Secretary 1880–82, Secretary of State for India 1882–85, 1886 & 1892–94, Foreign Secretary 1894–95; a vice-president of the club
- Charles William Kimmins, educational psychologist
- John Balfour, 1st Baron Kinross, Lord Justice General of Scotland 1899–1905; Lord Advocate 1881–85, 1886 & 1892–95; Solicitor General for Scotland 1880–1; Liberal MP 1880–99
- Herbert, 1st Earl Kitchener, field marshal and secretary of state for war 1914–16
- Lord Kirkwood, Lib Dem MP 1983–2005
- Baroness Kramer, Lib Dem MP 2005–10
- Sir V. T. Krishnamachari, Indian civil servant and administrator, Dian (title) of Baroda 1927–44; Prime Minister of Jaipur State 1946–49; member of the Rajya Sabha 1961–64
- Henry Labouchère, Radical Liberal MP 1865–66, 1867–68, 1880–1906
- Robert Laidlaw, Liberal MP, 1906–10
- Enid Lakeman, Director of the Electoral Reform Society, 1960–74
- J. Batty Langley, trade union official and Liberal MP, 1894–1909
- Frederick Joseph Laverack, Liberal MP, 1923–24
- Wallace Lawler, Liberal MP, 1969–70
- Sir Wilfrid Lawson, 2nd Baronet, of Brayton, Liberal MP, 1859–65, 1868–85, 1886–1900, 1903–06; founder member
- Walter Layton, 1st Baron Layton, economist, and editor of The Economist, 1922–38
- Joseph Leckie, Liberal/Liberal National MP, 1931–38
- Rodolphe Lemieux, Member of the Canadian Parliament, 1896–1930; Speaker of the Canadian Parliament, 1922–1930; Canadian senator, 1930–37
- Leighton Seager, 1st Baron Leighton of St Mellons, shipowner and Liberal peer
- Sir John Leng, Liberal MP 1889–1906; founder member
- Edward Lessing, Liberal MP, 1923–24
- William Lever, 1st Viscount Leverhulme, industrialist, philanthropist and Liberal MP 1906–09
- Joseph Hiam Levy, author and economist
- Thomas Arthur Lewis, Liberal MP, 1918–23
- Charles Wynn-Carington, 1st Marquess of Lincolnshire, President of the Board of Agriculture 1905–11; Chairman of the Club 1895–1921, President of the Club 1903–28
- Frederick Linfield, Liberal MP, 1922–24
- Gordon Lishman, Director of Age Concern 2000–09, Liberal/Lib Dem activist
- Sir Robert Ashton Lister, Liberal MP, 1918–22
- Sir Alexander Livingstone, Liberal MP, 1923–29
- Sir David Llewellyn, 1st Baronet, Welsh industrialist and financier
- Rhys Lloyd, Baron Lloyd of Kilgerran, Liberal peer, President of the Liberal Party, 1973–74
- Stephen Lloyd, Lib Dem MP, 2010–15 & 2017–2019
- David Lloyd George, Prime Minister, 1916–22; Liberal MP, 1890–1945; Chancellor of the Exchequer, 1908–15; Leader of the Liberal Party, 1926–31
- Robert Reid, 1st Earl Loreburn, Liberal MP, 1880–85 & 1886–1905, Lord Chancellor 1905–12
- William John Locke, novelist and playwright
- Thomas Lough, Parliamentary Secretary to the Board of Education 1905–08, Liberal MP 1892–1918
- John Frederick Loverseed, Liberal MP, 1923–24
- Richard Lovet, English Methodist minister and author
- David Low, cartoonist
- Henry Lucy, journalist, humourist, and parliamentary sketchwriter.
- Arnold Lupton, Liberal MP, 1906–1910
- Malcolm MacColl, clergyman and publicist.
- Ramsay MacDonald, Labour prime minister 1924 & 1929–35, Labour MP 1906–18, 1922–35 & 1936–37; joined when he was private secretary to Liberal MP Thomas Lough (see above)
- Dugald Macfadyen, clergyman and Liberal parliamentary candidate.
- Sir Donald Horne Macfarlane, Home Rule, Liberal and Crofters Party MP 1880–86 & 1892–95.
- Alasdair Mackenzie, farmer and Liberal MP 1964–70.
- Lord MacLennan, Leader of the SDP 1987–88, Acting Leader of the Liberal Democrats 1988, Labour (later SDP, later Lib Dem) MP 1966–2001
- J. G. Swift MacNeill, Irish Nationalist MP 1887–1918.
- Thomas James Macnamara, Liberal MP 1900–24.
- Sir Alexander MacRobert, businessman.
- Baroness Maddock, Lib Dem MP 1993–97, Lib Dem peer
- Sir John Maden, Liberal MP 1892–1900 & 1917–18.
- Dalrymple Maitland, Member of the Isle of Man House of Keys 1890–1919 and Speaker of the House 1909–19.
- Frederick Mallalieu, Liberal MP 1916–22.
- Frederick Mander, General Secretary of the National Union of Teachers, 1931–47.
- Harry Manfield, Liberal MP 1906–18.
- Horace Rendall Mansfield, Liberal MP 1900–18.
- Sir Frederick Mappin, 1st Baronet, factory owner and Liberal MP 1900–10.
- Francis John Marnham, businessman and Liberal MP 1906–10.
- Paul Marshall, financier and philanthropist
- David Marshall Mason, banker, businessman and Liberal MP 1910–18 & 1931–35.
- Robert Mason, National Liberal MP 1918–22.
- John Massie, Liberal MP 1906–10.
- Henry William Massingham, journalist, Editor of The Star 1890–91, Editor of The Nation 1907–23
- Charles Masterman, head of the British War Propaganda Bureau 1914–18, Chancellor of the Duchy of Lancaster 1914–15, Liberal MP 1906–14 & 1923–24
- Sir Alexander Matheson, 3rd Baronet, Senator for Western Australia, 1901–06.
- Aylmer Maude, translator of Tolstoy.
- Thomas Hayton Mawson, landscape architect and town planner.
- Vice-Admiral John McAnally, Commandant of the Royal College of Defence Studies, 1998–2001.
- R. B. McCallum, historian and inventor of psephology.
- Patrick McDermott, Irish Nationalist MP 1891–1902.
- Edward McHugh, Irish Nationalist MP 1892–1900.
- P. A. McHugh, Irish Narionalist MP 1892–1909.
- William McKillop, Irish Nationalist MP 1900–09.
- Walter McLaren, Liberal MP 1886–95 & 1910–12.
- Arnold McNair, judge of the International Court of Justice and first president of the European Court of Human Rights
- Lord McNally, Leader of the Liberal Democrats in the House of Lords 2004–13, Minister of State for Justice 2010–3, Labour (later SDP) MP 1979–83
- Michael Meadowcroft, Liberal MP 1983–87
- Thomas Meech, journalist and author.
- Sir Homi Maneck Mehta, Indian industrialist.
- Joseph William Mellor, chemist.
- William Melville, Head of the Secret Intelligence Service and first director-general of MI5, 1903–09.
- M. G. K. Menon, Indian physicist and policy maker.
- Sir Edward Merewether, Lieutenant Governor and Chief Secretary of Malta 1902–11, Governor of Sierra Leone 1911–16, Governor of the Leeward Islands 1916–21.
- James Meston, 1st Baron Meston, civil servant and businessman; Chairman of the Club
- Sir Algernon Methuen, 1st Baronet, founder of Methuen & Co.
- Hugh Meyler, solicitor, soldier and Liberal MP 1923–24.
- Ray Michie, Baroness Michie of Gallanach, Liberal and Lib Dem MP 1987–2001 and peer.
- Nathaniel Micklem, barrister and Liberal MP 1906–10.
- Thomas Molony, Solicitor-General for Ireland 1912–3, Attorney-general for Ireland 1913, last Lord Chief Justice of Ireland, 1918–24.
- Percy Molteno, barrister, businessman, philanthropist and Liberal MP 1906–18.
- Ludwig Mond, chemist and industrialist.
- Robert Collier, 2nd Baron Monkswell, cricketer and Liberal peer.
- Sir Rajendra Nath Mookerjee, Indian industrialist.
- Arnold Morley, Postmaster General 1892–95, Liberal MP 1880–95; founder member
- Charles Morley, musician and Liberal MP 1895–1906.
- John Morley, 1st Viscount Morley of Blackburn, historian, biographer, Chief Secretary for Ireland 1886 & 1892–95, Secretary of State for India 1905–10 & 1911, Liberal MP 1883–95 & 1896–1908
- Ian Morrow, "company doctor" and Liberal parliamentary candidate.
- Levi Lapper Morse, grocer, draper and Liberal MP 1906–10.
- William Ewart Morse, businessman and Liberal MP 1923–24.
- Alpheus Morton, architect and Liberal MP 1889–95 & 1906–18.
- E. J. C. Morton, barrister and Liberal MP 1892–1902.
- Felix Moscheles, painter, pacifist and early advocate of Esperanto.
- Patrick Seely, 3rd Baron Mottistone, Liberal parliamentary candidate and peer.
- Sir Arcot Ramasamy Mudaliar, Indian politician and statesman.
- Ramsay Muir, historian, philosopher, writer, and Liberal MP 1923–24.
- Sir Basanta Mullick, Indian civil servant and judge.
- Donald Murray, Liberal MP 1918–22.
- Gilbert Murray, classicist and humanist.
- Frank Murrell, businessman and Liberal MP 1923–24.
- M. A. Muthiah Chettiar, Indian banker, educationalist, philanthropist and politician.
- Horatio Myer, Liberal MP 1906–10.
- T. M. Nair, Indian politician and founder of the Justice Party
- Arthur Neal, Liberal MP 1918–22.
- Sir Thomas Neill, insurance executive and health campaigner.
- Henry Nevinson, war correspondent, a campaigning journalist exposing slavery in western Africa, and suffragist.
- Ernest Newman, Sunday Times music critic.
- George Newnes, Liberal MP 1885–95 & 1900–10, publisher, founding editor of The Strand Magazine
- Dadabhai Naoroji, Liberal MP 1892–95, intellectual and educator.
- David Nicholls, novelist and screenwriter.
- George Nicholls, Liberal MP 1906–10.
- Sir Patteson Nickalls, stockbroker and Liberal parliamentary candidate.
- Sir Christopher John Nixon, 1st Baronet, physician.
- William Compton, 5th Marquess of Northampton, Liberal MP 1885–86 & 1889–97.
- Cecil Norton, Liberal MP 1892–1916.
- Thomas Baring, 1st Earl of Northbrook, First Lord of the Admiralty 1880–85; founder member and first chairman of the club.
- Charles Wilson, 2nd Baron Nunburnholme, shipping magnate and Liberal MP 1906–07.
- Pat O'Brien, Irish Nationalist MP 1886–92 & 1895–1917, and Chief Whip of the Irish Nationalists 1907–17.
- John O'Connor, Irish Nationalist MP 1885–92 & 1905–18.
- T. P. O'Connor, Irish Nationalist MP 1880–1929 and "Father of the House"
- William O'Doherty, Irish Nationalist MP 1900–05.
- Frederick Ogden, Liberal MP 1910–18.
- Thomas O'Hagan, 1st Baron O'Hagan, Lord Chancellor 1870–74 & 1880–82, founder member
- Edward Peter O'Kelly, Irish Nationalist MP 1895 & 1910–4.
- Charles O'Neill, Irish Nationalist MP 1909–18.
- Lembit Öpik, Lib Dem MP 1997–2010
- John White, 1st Baron Overtoun, chemical manufacturer and philanthropist.
- Thomas Owen, Liberal MP 1892–98.
- William Monson, 1st Viscount Oxenbridge, Liberal chief whip in the House of Lords 1880–92.
- Monroe Palmer, Baron Palmer of Childs Hill, Liberal Party Treasurer 1977–83; Liberal parliamentary candidate; Lib Dem peer.
- George William Palmer, Liberal MP 1892–95 & 1898–1904.
- Kate Parminter, Baroness Parminter, Chief Executive of the Campaign to Protect Rural England, 1998–2004, and Lib Dem peer.
- Edward Parrott, writer and Liberal MP 1917–18.
- Sir Hubert Parry, 1st Baronet, composer.
- Thomas Henry Parry, solicitor, soldier and Liberal MP, 1913–24.
- John Brown Paton, author and educationalist.
- Sir Robert Pattinson, businessman and Liberal MP, 1922–23.
- Samuel Pattinson, businessman and Liberal MP, 1922–24.
- Arthur Peake, Biblical scholar.
- Robert Pearce, Liberal MP 1906–10, 1910–18.
- Sir James Peiris, Sri Lankan independence politician, and first elected vice-president of the Legislative Council of Ceylon, 1924–30.
- Henry Pelling, historian.
- David Penhaligon, Liberal MP 1974–86.
- Sir Robert Perks, 1st Baronet, Liberal MP, 1892–1910.
- George Herbert Perris, creator and editor of the Home University Library of Modern Knowledge.
- Sir John Budd Phear, Chief Justice of Ceylon, 1877–79.
- Ben Pickard, coal miner, trade union general secretary, and Lib-Lab MP, 1885–1904.
- Sir George Augustus Pilkington, doctor and Liberal MP, 1885–86 & 1899–1900.
- Roger Pincham, Chairman of the Liberal Party, 1979–83.
- Lyon Playfair, 1st Baron Playfair, scientist, Liberal MP 1868–92, and Postmaster-General 1873–74.
- Sir George Pollard, physician, barrister and Liberal MP 1906–18.
- Alfred Thomas, 1st Baron Pontypridd, Liberal MP 1885–1910.
- Thomas Bayley Potter, Liberal MP 1865–95.
- John O'Connor Power, Fenian leader and Home Rule MP for County Mayo 1874–85. In 1884 he moved to the Liberal party to strengthen the Irish Liberal Alliance and was involved in the training of Liberal politicians. Inspiration for Conan Doyle's Professor Moriarty.
- Prem Prakash, Indian actor and producer.
- David Pratt, South African farmer & socialite, who attempted to assassinate Prime Minister Hendrik Verwoerd in 1960 over the latter's role as the founder of South African apartheid
- Robert John Price, surgeon, barrister and Liberal MP.
- William Pringle, Liberal MP 1922–24.
- Urban Pritchard, otologist.
- Sir Robert Pullar, Liberal MP 1907–10.
- Henry George Purchase, barrister and Liberal MP, 1918–22.
- George Haven Putnam, American author, soldier and publisher; elected a Temporary Member of the NLC in 1888–89.
- Lionel Edward Pyke, barrister.
- Sir George Heynes Radford, Liberal MP 1906–17, and Chairman of National Liberal Club Buildings Ltd, which constructed the club.
- Peter Wilson Raffan, Liberal MP 1910–22 & 1923–24.
- Frank Walter Raffety, barrister and Liberal parliamentary candidate.
- Sir C. P. Ramaswami Iyer, Diwan (Prime Minister) of Travancore, 1936–1947, who died "suddenly and peacefully, sitting in an armchair" in the club in 1966
- Adam Rolland Rainy, Liberal MP 1906–11.
- Cecil Norton, 1st Baron Rathcreedan, Liberal MP, 1892–1916.
- Sir Benegal Narsing Rau, Indian civil servant and diplomat, best known for co-drafting the Constitution of India.
- Edmund Charles Rawlings, solicitor and Liberal parliamentary candidate
- Lord Razzall, Liberal parliamentary candidate and Lib Dem peer.
- Walter Rea, 1st Baron Rea, Liberal MP 1906–18, 1923–24 & 1931–35; Liberal chief whip 1931–35.
- Philip Rea, 2nd Baron Rea, Chairman of the Liberal Party, 1950–52; President of the Liberal Party, 1955, Leader of the Liberal Party in the House of Lords, 1955–67.
- Russell Rea, ship-owner and Liberal MP 1900–16.
- H. J. Reckitt, Liberal MP 1893, 1895–1907
- Sir James Reckitt, founder of household products company Reckitt and Sons.
- Thomas Wemyss Reid, Editor of the Leeds Mercury 1870–87, Manager of Cassell & Co. 1887–1905, novelist and writer.
- Leifchild Jones, 1st Baron Rhayader, Liberal MP 1905–10, 1910–18, 1923–24 & 1929–31
- David Alfred Thomas, 1st Viscount Rhondda, Liberal MP, 1888–1910; Minister of Food Control, 1917–18.
- Sir John Rigby, Liberal MP 1885–86 & 1892–94; Solicitor General 1892–94; Attorney General 1894.
- Karin Riis-Jørgensen Danish MEP.
- Oliver Robbins, Permanent Secretary of the Department for Exiting the European Union, 2016–present
- Charles Henry Roberts, Liberal MP 1906–18 & 1922–23
- Sir George Scott Robertson, soldier, author, colonial administrator, and Liberal MP 1906–16
- J. M. Robertson, journalist, secularist and Liberal MP 1906–18
- Sydney Walter Robinson, farmer, building contractor and Liberal MP 1923–24.
- Sir Thomas Robinson, corn merchant and Liberal MP 1880–81 & 1885–95.
- Thomas Atholl Robertson, fine arts printer, publisher, Liberal MP 1923–24; and Chairman of the NLC political committee
- Inga-Stina Robson, Anglo-Swedish political activist, Liberal/Lib Dem peer
- Sir Lawrence Robson, accountant and President of the Liberal Party, 1953–54.
- Ernest Lamb, 1st Baron Rochester, Liberal MP 1910–18; Paymaster-General, 1931–35.
- Foster Charles Lowry Lamb, 2nd Baron Rochester, Lib Dem peer
- Thorold Rogers, economist, historian and Liberal MP 1880–86; founder member
- Henry Enfield Roscoe, chemist and Liberal MP 1885–95
- Rev Sir David Rocyn-Jones, health officer.
- Thomas Roe, 1st Baron Roe, businessman and Liberal MP, 1883–95 & 1900–16.
- James Guinness Rogers, nonconformist clergyman.
- Edward Rose, playwright.
- Paul Rowen, Lib Dem MP 2005–10
- James Rowlands, Liberal MP, 1886–95 & 1906–20.
- Arnold Stephenson Rowntree, Liberal MP 1910–18.
- Philip Foale Rowsell, pharmacist, insurer and Liberal parliamentary candidate.
- Walter Runciman, 1st Baron Runciman, Liberal MP 1914–18
- Charles Russell, Baron Russell of Killowen, Liberal MP 1880–94; Attorney General, 1886 & 1892–94; Lord Chief Justice of England, 1894–1900.
- Edward Russell, 1st Baron Russell of Liverpool, journalist and Liberal MP, 1885–87.
- G. W. E. Russell, Liberal MP 1880–85, 1892–95; founder member.
- Richard John Russell, Liberal and Liberal National MP, 1929–43.
- Thomas Wallace Russell, Unionist MP 1886–1910 & 1911–18
- James Rankin Rutherford, Scottish landowner and Liberal parliamentary candidate.
- Richard D. Ryder, psychologist and animal rights activist.
- John Philipps, 1st Viscount St Davids, Liberal MP 1888–95 and peer
- Shapurji Saklatvala, Communist MP 1922–23, 1924–9.
- Herbert Samuel, Home Secretary 1916 & 1931–32, High Commissioner of Palestine 1920–25, Leader of the Liberal Party 1931–35, Leader of the Liberals in the House of Lords 1944–55, Liberal MP 1902–18 & 1929–35.
- Jonathan Samuel, manufacturer and Liberal MP 1895–1900 & 1910–17
- Sir Chettur Sankaran Nair, President of the Indian National Congress in 1897.
- Christopher Sapara Williams, first Nigerian lawyer to practice at the English bar, in 1879.
- His Highness Maharaja Mahipal Singh Sarila, Raja of Sarila, Uttar Pradesh, 1919–83.
- Sir P. S. Sivaswami Iyer, Advocate-General of the Madras Presidency 1907–11, Member of the Council of State of India, 1922–23, elected a temporary member in 1922.
- Sir Ramaswami Srinivasa Sarma, Indian politician and journalist.
- Sir Stewart Schneider, Solicitor-General of Ceylon, 1917.
- C. P. Scott, editor of the Manchester Guardian 1872–1929, Liberal MP 1895–1906
- Rev. Bill Scott, Ecclesiastical Chaplain to Elizabeth II, 2007–15.
- Charles Scribner, American publisher; elected as a Temporary Member of the NLC in 1888–89
- Brian Sedgemore, Labour MP 1974–79 & 1983–2005, Lib Dem defector
- Richard Seddon, Prime Minister of New Zealand 1893–1906, and longest ever holder of that post.
- Nancy Seear, Baroness Seear, academic and Liberal/Lib Dem peer
- Lewis Sergeant, writer, journalist and biographer.
- William Kean Seymour, writer, novelist and banker.
- Sir Mian Muhammad Shafi, co-founder of the All-India Muslim League in 1906.
- Ignatius O'Brien, 1st Baron Shandon, Lord Chancellor of Ireland 1913–18
- Sir Edward Sharp, 1st Baronet, manufacturer.
- George Bernard Shaw, writer, journalist, playwright and socialist
- Elizabeth Shields, Liberal MP, 1986–87.
- Lord Shipley, Lib Dem peer, Leader of Newscastle City Council 2006–10
- Sir Archibald Sinclair, Leader of the Liberal Party 1935–45, Secretary of State for Air 1940–45, Liberal MP 1922–45.
- Sir Clive Sinclair, inventor and entrepreneur.
- Sunny Singh, author and novelist.
- Satyendra Prasanno Sinha, 1st Baron Sinha, Indian nationalist politician.
- Granville Slack, judge and Liberal parliamentary candidate.
- Edward Smallwood, coal merchant and Liberal MP 1917–18.
- Cyril Smith, Liberal MP 1972–92
- Rodney "Gipsy" Smith, evangelist and supporter of the Salvation Army.
- Reginald Arthur Smith, journalist and author.
- Adrian Solomons, Australian politician; Leader of the Country Party, 1974–78.
- William Somervell, businessman, philanthropist, and Liberal MP in 1918.
- Richard Causton, 1st Baron Southwark, Paymaster-General 1905–10, Liberal MP 1880–85 & 1888–1910; founder member.
- Harold Spender, author, journalist, and Liberal parliamentary candidate.
- Stephen Spender, poet and novelist
- Sir Albert Spicer, 1st Baroney, Liberal MP 1892–1900 & 1906–18.
- Richard Grosvenor, 1st Baron Stalbridge, Liberal MP 1861–86, Liberal whip 1880–85; founder member
- James Stansfeld, President of the Local Government Board 1871–74 & 1886, Liberal MP 1859–95.
- Edward Stanley, 4th Baron Stanley of Alderley, Liberal MP 1880–85 and peer.
- Philip Stanhope, 1st Baron Weardale, Liberal MP 1886–92, 1893–1900 & 1904–06
- Charles Walter Starmer, newspaper proprietor and Liberal MP, 1923–24.
- Michael Steed, psephologist and Liberal/Lib Dem politician.
- Lord Steel, Leader of the Liberal Party 1976–88, Liberal/Lib Dem MP 1965–97, Presiding Officer (Speaker) of the Scottish Parliament 1999–2003, Lib Dem peer; Vice-president of the Club
- Sir James Steel, Lord Provost of Edinburgh 1900–03.
- Ernest Stenning, Archdeacon of Man, 1958–64
- Sir Henry Kenyon Stephenson, 1st Baronet, businessman and Liberal/National Liberal MP 1918–23.
- Sir Daniel Macaulay Stevenson, 1st Baronet, businessman, philanthropist and Chancellor of Glasgow University 1934–44.
- Sir Halley Stewart, businessman, philanthropist, and Liberal MP 1887–95 & 1906–10.
- Bram Stoker, theatre manager and author of Dracula.
- Peter Stollery, Canadian Liberal MP 1972–81, Senator 1981–2010.
- Bertram Stuart Straus, businessmen and Liberal MP, 1906–10.
- Edward Anthony Strauss, businessman, Liberal MP 1906–23, Independent Constitutionalist MP 1927–29, and Liberal National MP 1931–39.
- James Stuart, scientist and Liberal MP 1884–1900 & 1906–10.
- Charles Stubbs, Bishop of Truro, 1906–12.
- Donal Sullivan, Irish Nationalist MP, 1883–1907.
- James Woolley Summers, Liberal MP 1910–13.
- Charles Summersby, draper and Liberal National MP 1935–39.
- John Sutherland, Liberal MP 1905–18.
- Samuel Montagu, 1st Baron Swaythling, banker and Liberal MP 1885–1900.
- J. G. Swift MacNeill, Professor of constitutional law and Irish Nationalist MP 1887–1918.
- Shapland Hugh Swinny, economist.
- Lawson Tait, surgeon.
- Richard Tangye, engineer and philanthropist.
- Sir Charles James Tarring, Chief Justice of Grenada, 1897–1905.
- Lord Taylor of Goss Moor, Liberal & Lib Dem MP 1987–2010
- Theodore Cooke Taylor, Liberal MP 1900–18, and the longest-lived British MP.
- William Tebb, social reformer.
- Joy Tetley, Archdeacon of Worcester, 1999–2008.
- Lord Teverson, Lib Dem MEP 1994–99
- Abel Thomas, Liberal MP, 1890–1912.
- Dylan Thomas, Welsh poet and writer
- Sir Maldwyn Thomas, President of the Welsh Liberal Party, 1985–86.
- William Moy Thomas, novelist and journalist.
- John Pennington Thomasson, Liberal MP, 1880–85.
- Trevelyan Thomson, Liberal MP, 1918–28.
- Jeremy Thorpe, Leader of the Liberal Party 1967–76, Liberal MP 1959–79
- Charles John Tibbits, newspaper editor
- Grigori Tokaty, rocket scientist and Soviet dissident writer.
- Robert Parkinson Tomlinson, corn market and Liberal MP, 1928–29.
- Andrew Mitchell Torrance, Liberal MP, 1906–09.
- Lord Tordoff, Lib Dem peer
- Sir George Toulmin, newspaper editor and Liberal MP, 1902–18.
- Jesse Boot, 1st Baron Trent, founder of Boots chemists, Liberal peer.
- Sir Charles Trevelyan, Liberal MP 1899–1918, Labour MP 1922–31, President of the Board of Education 1924 & 1929–31
- G. M. Trevelyan, Whig historian
- Sir George Otto Trevelyan, Liberal MP 1865–97, Chief Secretary for Ireland 1882–84, Secretary for Scotland 1886 & 1892–95
- Joseph Herbert Tritton, banker.
- Sir Adolph Tuck, fine art publisher.
- Thomas Frederic Tweed, novelist.
- Lord Tyler, Liberal/Lib Dem MP 1974 & 1992–2005
- Thomas Fisher Unwin, publisher.
- Francis Vane, supporter of the Boy Scout movement
- Frederick Verney, clergyman, barrister, diplomat and Liberal MP 1906–10.
- William Vestey, 1st Baron Vestey, shipping magnate and Liberal peer.
- Henry Harvey Vivian, trade unionist, campaigner for profit-sharing & co-ownership, and Liberal MP 1906–10 & 1923–24.
- Donald Wade, Liberal MP 1950–64 and Liberal peer.
- Laurence Ambrose Waldron, businessman and Irish Nationalist MP, 1904–10.
- Ronald Walker, President of the Liberal Party, 1952–53.
- Sir Samuel Walker, Liberal MP 1884–85, barrister, judge, and Lord Chancellor of Ireland 1892–95 & 1905–11.
- Edgar Wallace, crime writer, journalist, novelist and playwright
- Lord Wallace of Saltaire, academic and Lib Dem government whip 2010–present
- Diana Wallis Lib Dem MEP 1999–present
- David Sydney Waterlow, Liberal MP 1906–10.
- Philip Watkins, accountant and Liberal parliamentary candidate.
- Lord Watson, Lib Dem peer
- Robert Spence Watson, reformer and political activist; President of the National Liberal Federation, 1890–1902; founder member of the club, later its vice-president
- Henry Anderson Watt, Liberal MP 1906–18.
- Thomas Wayman, Liberal MP 1885–99.
- Henry Webb, Liberal MP 1911–18 & 1923–24
- Sidney Webb, socialist writer, economist, co-founder of the London School of Economics.
- Sir William Wedderburn, Liberal MP 1893–1900, British civil servant and reformer in India
- James Galloway Weir, Liberal MP 1892–1911.
- H. G. Wells, writer, journalist, novelist, pacifist and socialist
- John Westlake, legal scholar.
- George White (Liberal politician), Liberal MP 1900–12.
- Graham White, Liberal MP 1922–24 & 1929–45, and President of the Liberal Party 1954–55.
- Sir Luke White, Liberal MP 1910–18
- John Howard Whitehouse, headmaster, and Liberal MP 1900–18.
- Edward Wickham, Headmaster of Wellington College 1873–1893, and Dean of Lincoln Cathedral 1894–1910.
- Basil Wigoder, Baron Wigoder, barrister, Liberal parliamentary candidate and Liberal peer.
- Sir Gerard Wijeyekoon, Ceylonese lawyer, politician, and first president of the Senate of Ceylon.
- Harry Willcock, anti-ID card campaigner in the 1950s
- Michael Willcocks, British Army General and "Black Rod" 2001–09
- Aneurin Williams, Liberal MP 1910 & 1914–22.
- Arthur John Williams, Liberal MP 1885–95; founder member
- Henry Sylvester Williams, Trinidadian lawyer and Pan-African politician
- Christmas Price Williams, Liberal MP 1924–29.
- Sir George Clark Williams, barrister.
- John Carvell Williams, Liberal MP 1885–86 & 1892–1900.
- W. Llewelyn Williams, journalist and Liberal MP 1906–18.
- Henry Williamson, soldier, writer, farmer, ruralist, and author of Tarka the Otter.
- Herbert Willison, solicitor and Liberal MP 1923–24.
- Havelock Wilson, trade unionist and Liberal MP 1892–1900, 1906–10 & 1918–22.
- John Wilson, Lib-Lab MP 1885–86 & 1890–1915, and general secretary of Durham Miners' Association, 1896–1915.
- John William Wilson, Liberal Unionist/Liberal MP, 1895–1922.
- Philip Whitwell Wilson, Liberal MP 1906–10 and journalist.
- Sir Thomas Fleming Wilson, Liberal MP 1910–11.
- Richard Winfrey, Liberal MP 1906–24, junior Agriculture Minister 1916–18, newspaper publisher, and agricultural rights campaigner.
- Thomas Edward Wing, Liberal MP, 1910 & 1913–18.
- Michael Winstanley, Baron Winstanley, television/radio doctor, Liberal MP 1966–70 & 1974, and Liberal peer.
- Murdoch McKenzie Wood, Liberal MP 1919–24, 1929–35.
- Thomas McKinnon Wood, Secretary for Scotland 1912–16, Liberal MP 1906–18, Chairman of London County Council 1898–99
- Sir Corbet Woodall, Governor of the Gas Light and Coke Company 1906–16.
- William Woodall, Liberal MP 1880–1900 and women's suffragist.
- Sir German Woodhead, pathologist.
- Leonard Woolf, author, publisher, political theorist and husband of Virginia Woolf
- Sir Alfred William Yeo, businessman and Liberal MP 1914–22.
- Samuel Young, brewer, Irish Nationalist MP 1892–1918, and oldest-ever British MP.
- Richard Younger-Ross Lib Dem MP 2001–10

Besides the members, famous guests who have signed the Visitors' Book over the years have included Tony Benn, Mahatma Gandhi, Field Marshal Montgomery, and Harold Wilson.

=== Notable expulsions/resignations from the club ===
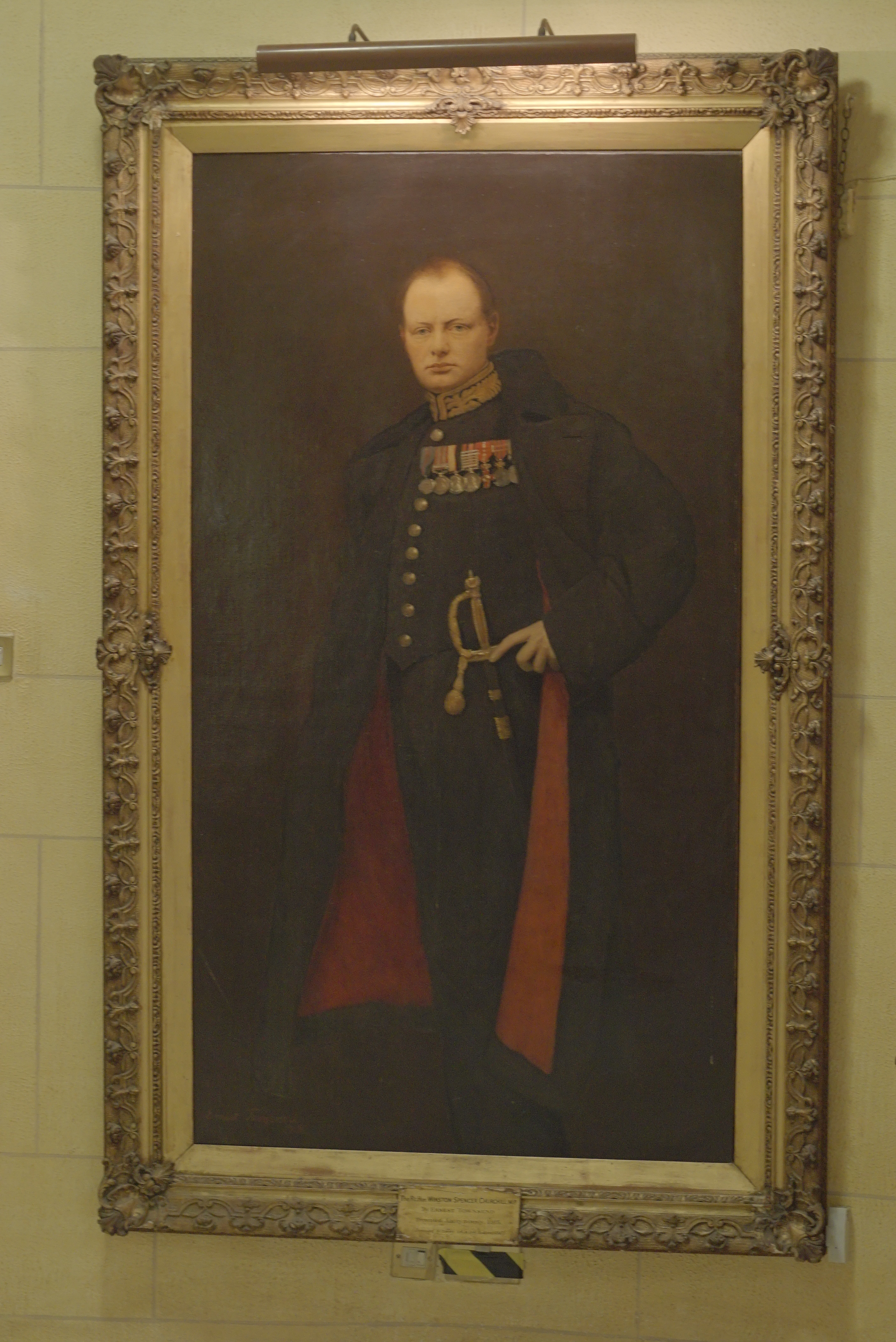
The young Winston Churchill was a member of the club for over 18 years; his 1915 portrait by Ernest Townsend, damaged in the 1941 bombing of the club, still hangs today.

- Jabez Balfour, property developer and Liberal MP 1880–85 & 1889–93, convicted of property fraud involving a pyramid scheme when constructing the building next door to the club; a founder member, expelled from the club.
- Sir Edward Carson, Leader of the Irish Unionist party 1910–21, Unionist MP 1892–1921, did not resign from the club until 1887, even though he joined the Liberal Unionists almost immediately upon their split in 1886 – something about which he was periodically teased for decades afterwards by political rivals including Winston Churchill.
- Joseph Chamberlain, Liberal (later Liberal Unionist) MP 1876–1914, president of the Board of Trade 1880–85, president of the Local Government Board 1886, Colonial Secretary 1895–1903, Leader of the Liberal Unionists after the 1886 split, resigning from the NLC shortly thereafter
- Winston Churchill, Conservative prime minister 1940–45 and 1951–55, MP 1900–22 & 1924–64, sitting as a Liberal MP 1904–22. A banquet was held at the NLC (in what is now the Lloyd George Room) on 20 January 1905 to mark his defection to the Liberals several months earlier. He joined the club on 6 January 1906 (having been sponsored by Lloyd George and the club's then-president and chairman Lord Carrington), and resigned from it on 26 November 1924, one month after joining the Conservative government of Stanley Baldwin. He gave ten speeches at the club between 1905 and 1943, and continued to lunch there as a guest during the Second World War.
- Marquess of Hartington, Leader of the Liberal Party 1875–80, Secretary of State for War 1866 & 1882–85, Chief Secretary for Ireland 1871–74, Secretary of State for India 1880–82, Liberal (later Liberal Unionist) MP 1857–68 & 1869–1891; resigned from the club in 1887 over Home Rule
- Archibald Primrose, 5th Earl of Rosebery, Liberal prime minister 1894–95, resigned from the club in September 1909, denouncing it as "a hotbed of socialism."
- John Simon, 1st Viscount Simon, Home Secretary 1915–16 & 1935–37, Foreign Secretary 1931–35, Chancellor of the Exchequer 1937–40, Lord Chancellor 1940–45, Liberal (later National Liberal) MP 1906–18 & 1922–40, Leader of the National Liberal Party 1931–40; forced to resign from the NLC after speaking in support of the Conservative candidate in the 1948 Croydon North by-election

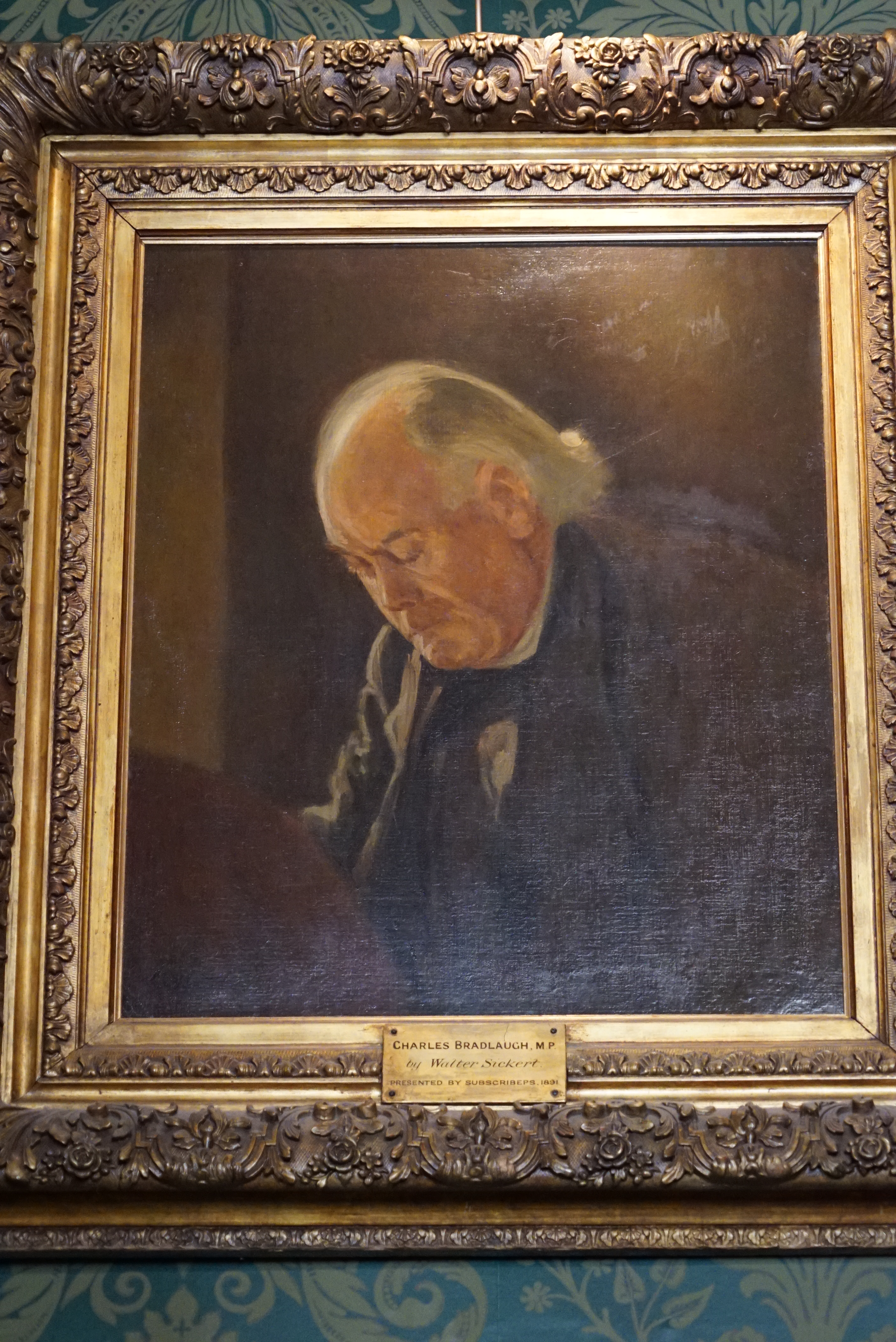
The club's portrait of Charles Bradlaugh, painted by Walter Sickert

=== Notable rejections of applications for membership ===
- Charles Bradlaugh, secularist and radical Liberal MP 1880–91, was invited to join the club at its launch in 1882 (along with all other Liberal MPs), but then suffered the ignominity of being rejected when he submitted his application. However, he eventually joined the club in 1890. Walter Sickert's portrait of Bradlaugh now hangs in the club.

=== Notable staff ===
- George Awdry (1916–94), younger brother of Thomas the Tank Engine creator the Rev. Wilbert Awdry, was the club librarian from the 1950s until 1977, and often assisted in writing and illustrating his brother's books. An active member of the Richard III Society, for many years he ensured that they were able to hold their meetings at the club.
- William Digby, author, journalist and humanitarian was the NLC's first club secretary from 1882 to 1887.
- Arthur Wollaston Hutton, writer and theologian, was Club Librarian from 1889 to 1899.
- The left-wing playwright Harold Pinter worked as a waiter at the club in the 1950s, and was fired for daring to interrupt the conversation of several diners, disagreeing with what he thought to be a particularly ignorant conversation.
- The novelist Deborah Moggach worked as a waitress in the club in the 1970s, recalling, "My nicest job was as a waitress doing breakfasts at the National Liberal Club. I'd get up early, put on my quite fetching waitress outfit, serve breakfast for four hours, get cash in a brown envelope every day and spend it. Then go back the next day, get another envelope and spend that."

== Reciprocal arrangements ==
The club is open to members from Mondays to Fridays, 8:00am–11:30 pm. During the weekend members may use the East India Club in St. James's Square. There are also reciprocal arrangements with over 250 other clubs worldwide, granting members a comfortable place to stay and to entertain when abroad. The club does not affiliate with the NULC (National Union of Liberal Clubs), which represents the interests of Liberal Working Men's Clubs in the country nationwide.

=== List of reciprocal clubs worldwide ===
As of 2020, the NLC's reciprocal clubs around the world are as follows (club foundation dates are provided in brackets):

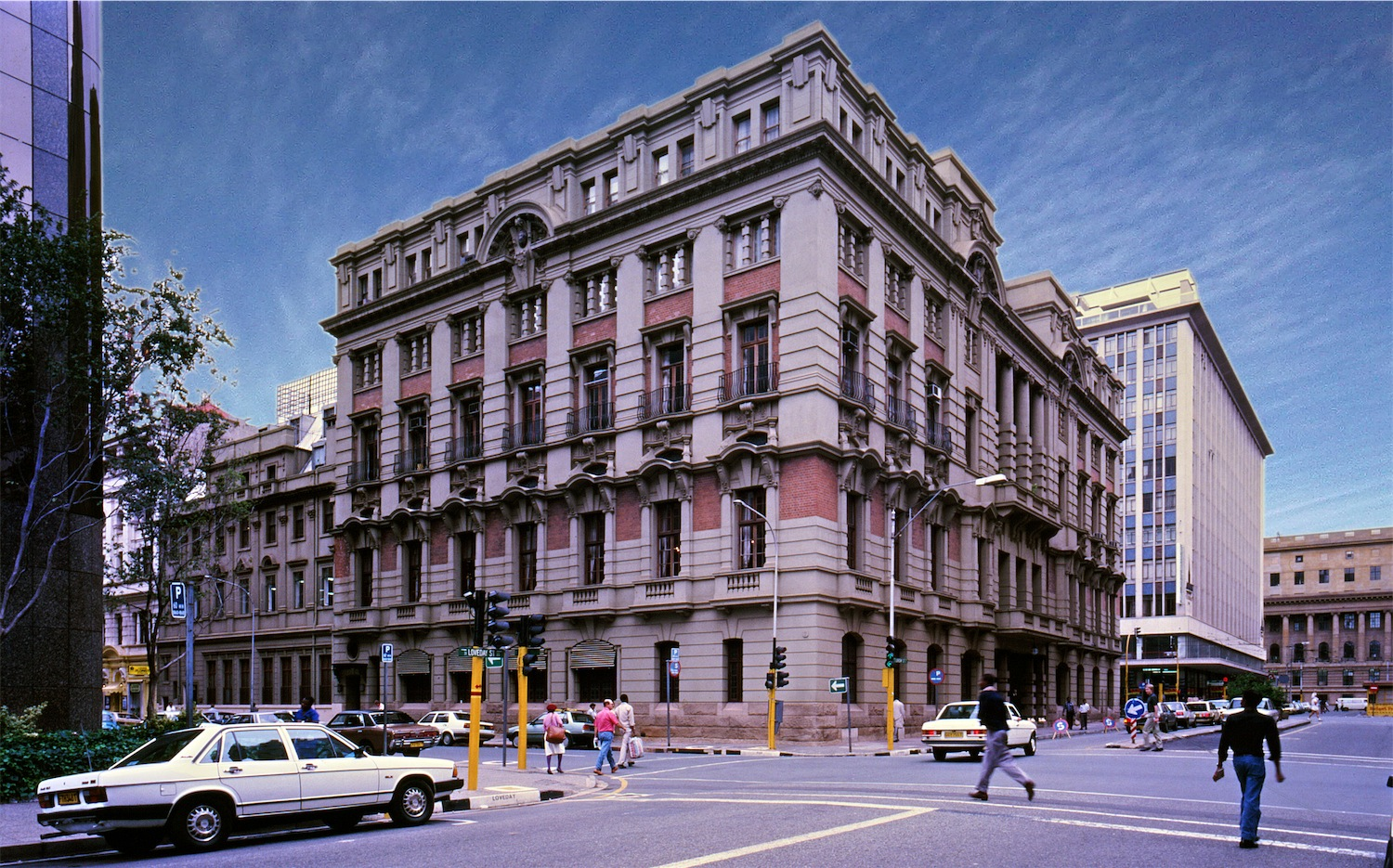
The Rand Club of Johannesburg

- Africa:

- Botswana: The Princeton Lounge, Gaborone (2015).
- Egypt: Cairo Capital Club, Cairo (1997).
- Ghana: Front/Back, Accra (2019).
- Nigeria: Capital Club, Lagos (2013).
- South Africa:

- Gauteng: Country Club, Johannesburg (1906); Rand Club, Johannesburg (1887); Wanderers Club, Johannesburg (1888).
- KwaZulu-Natal: Durban Club, Durban (1854).
- Northern Cape: Kimberley Club, Kimberley (1881).
- Eastern Cape: Port Elizabeth St George's Club, Port Elizabeth (1866).
- Western Cape: Cape Town Club, Cape Town (1858).

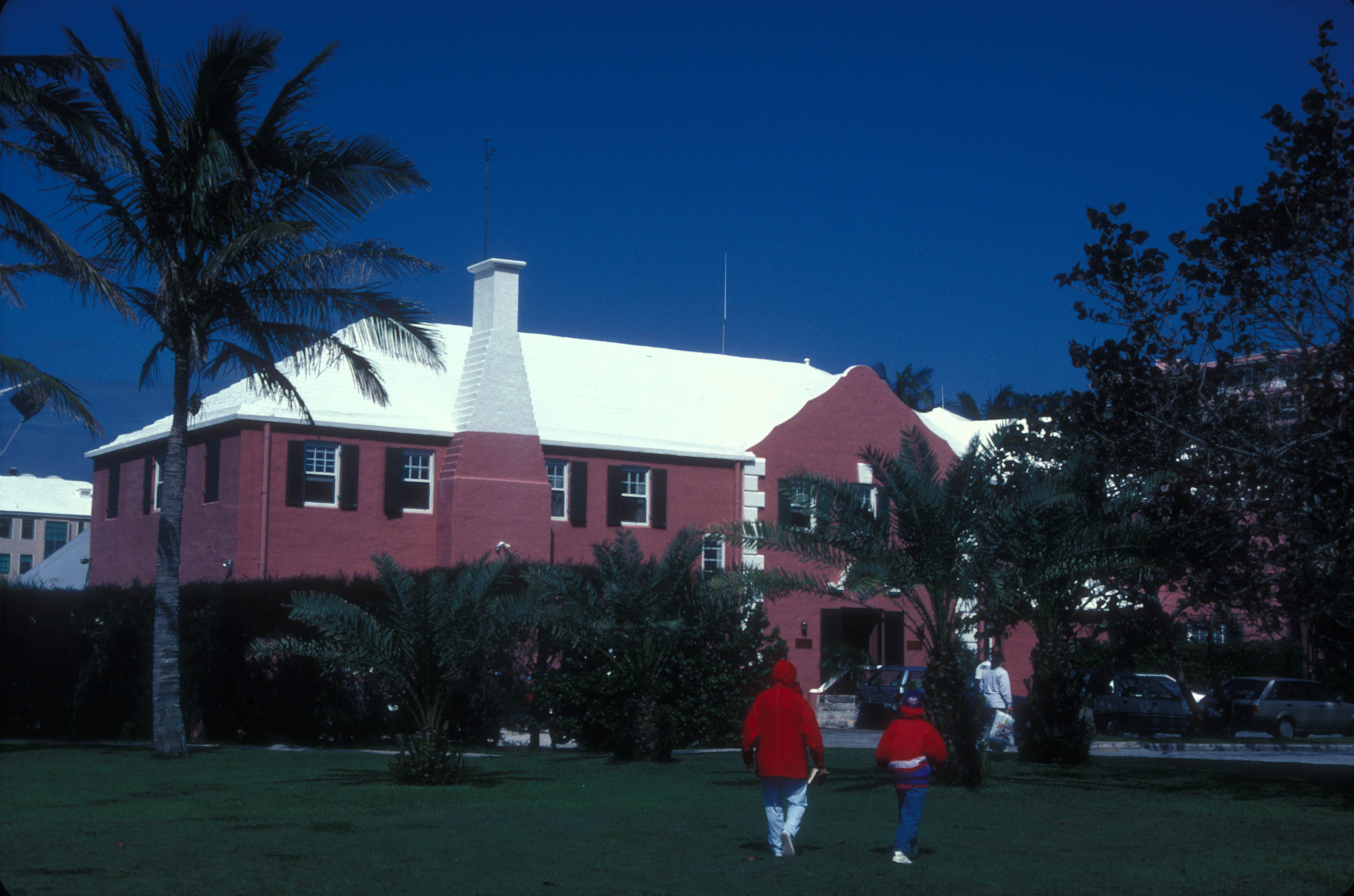
The Royal Bermuda Yacht Club of Hamilton

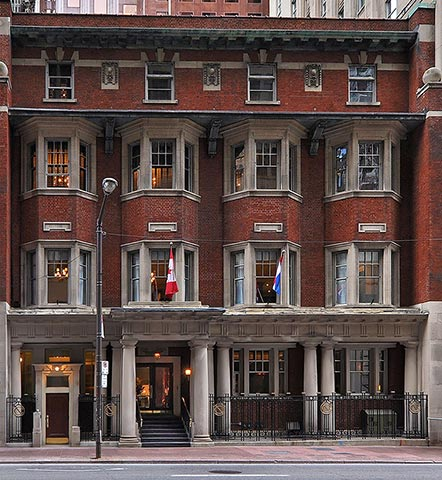
The National Club of Toronto

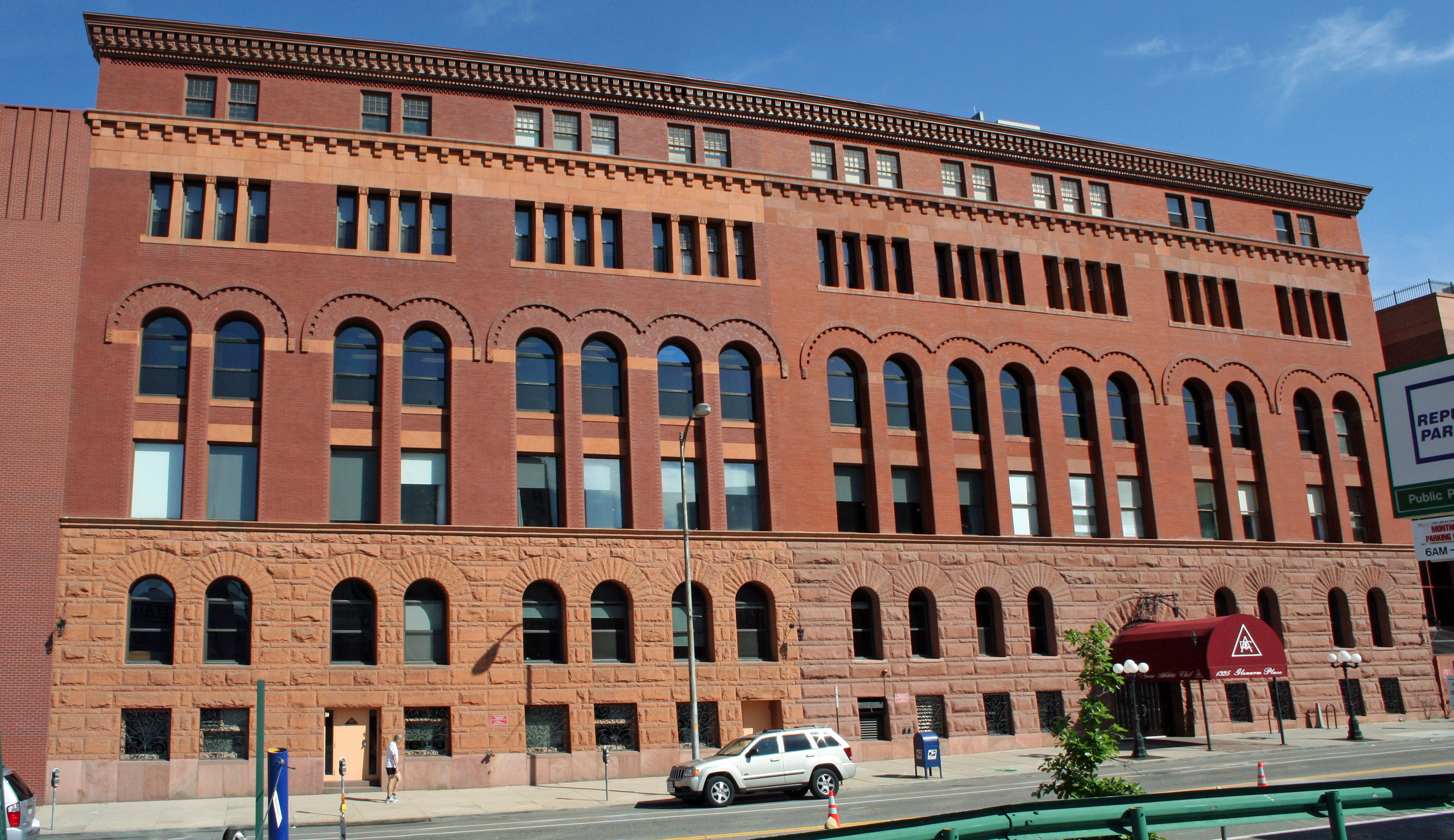
The Denver Athletic Club

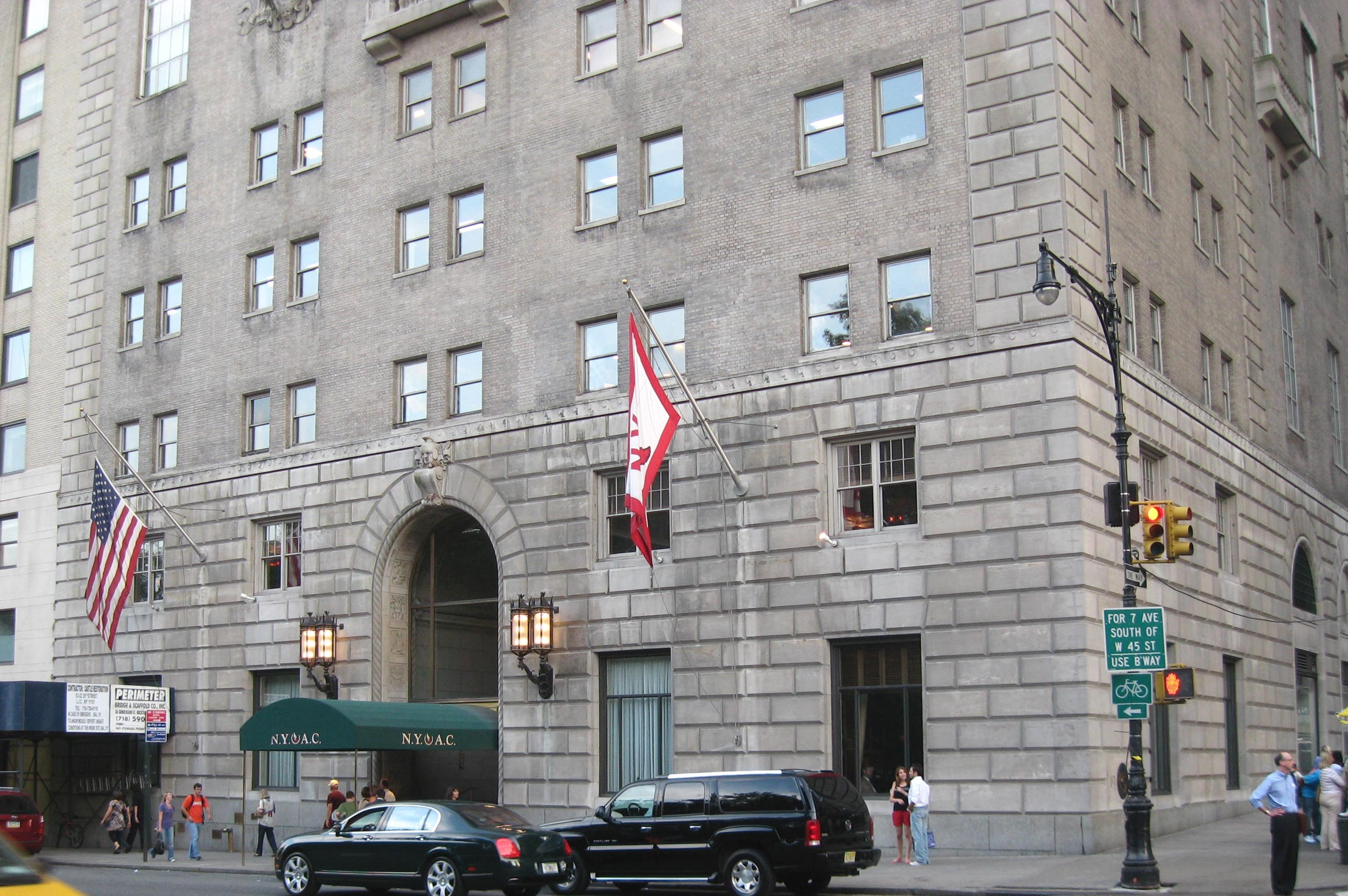
The New York Athletic Club

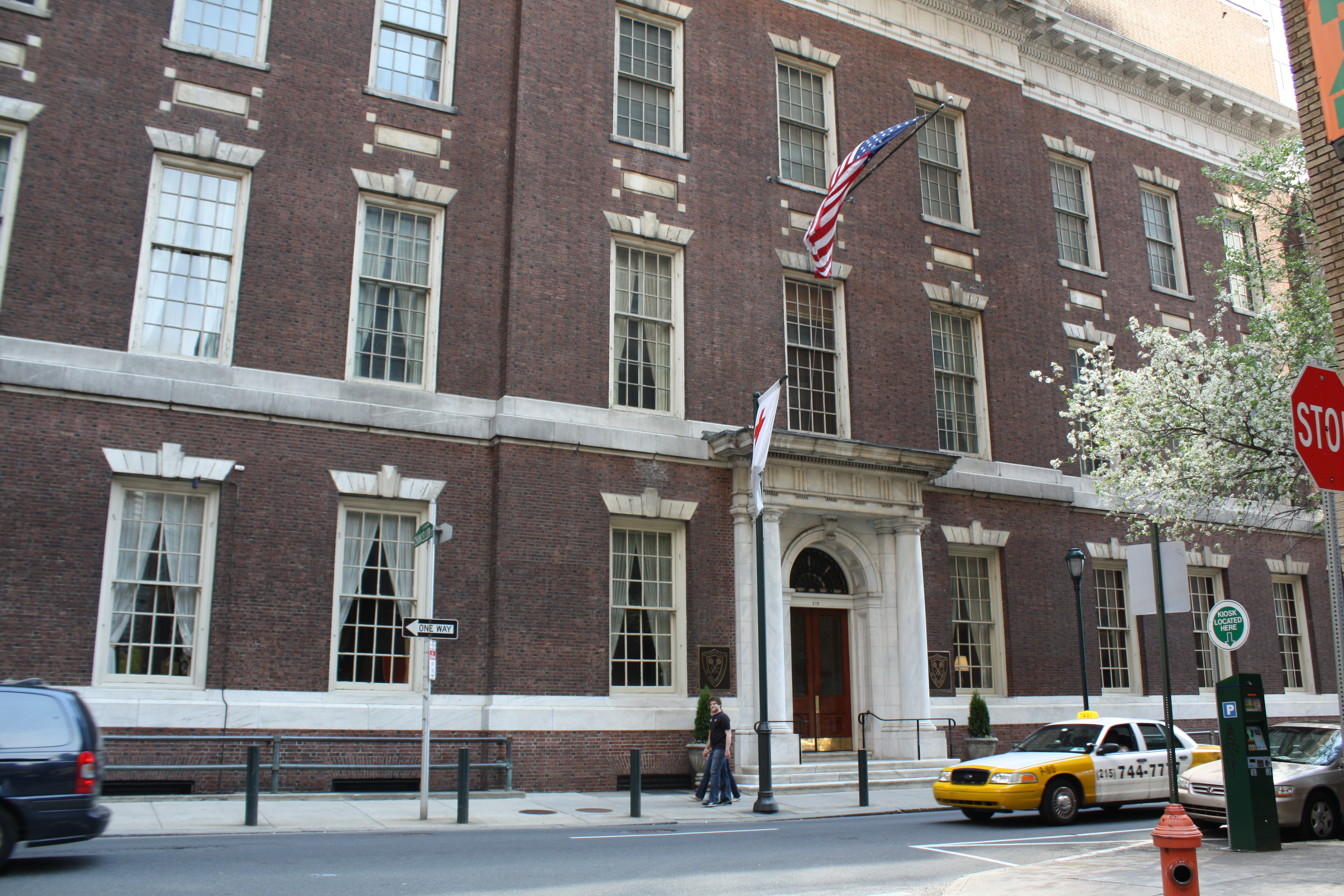
The Racquet Club of Philadelphia

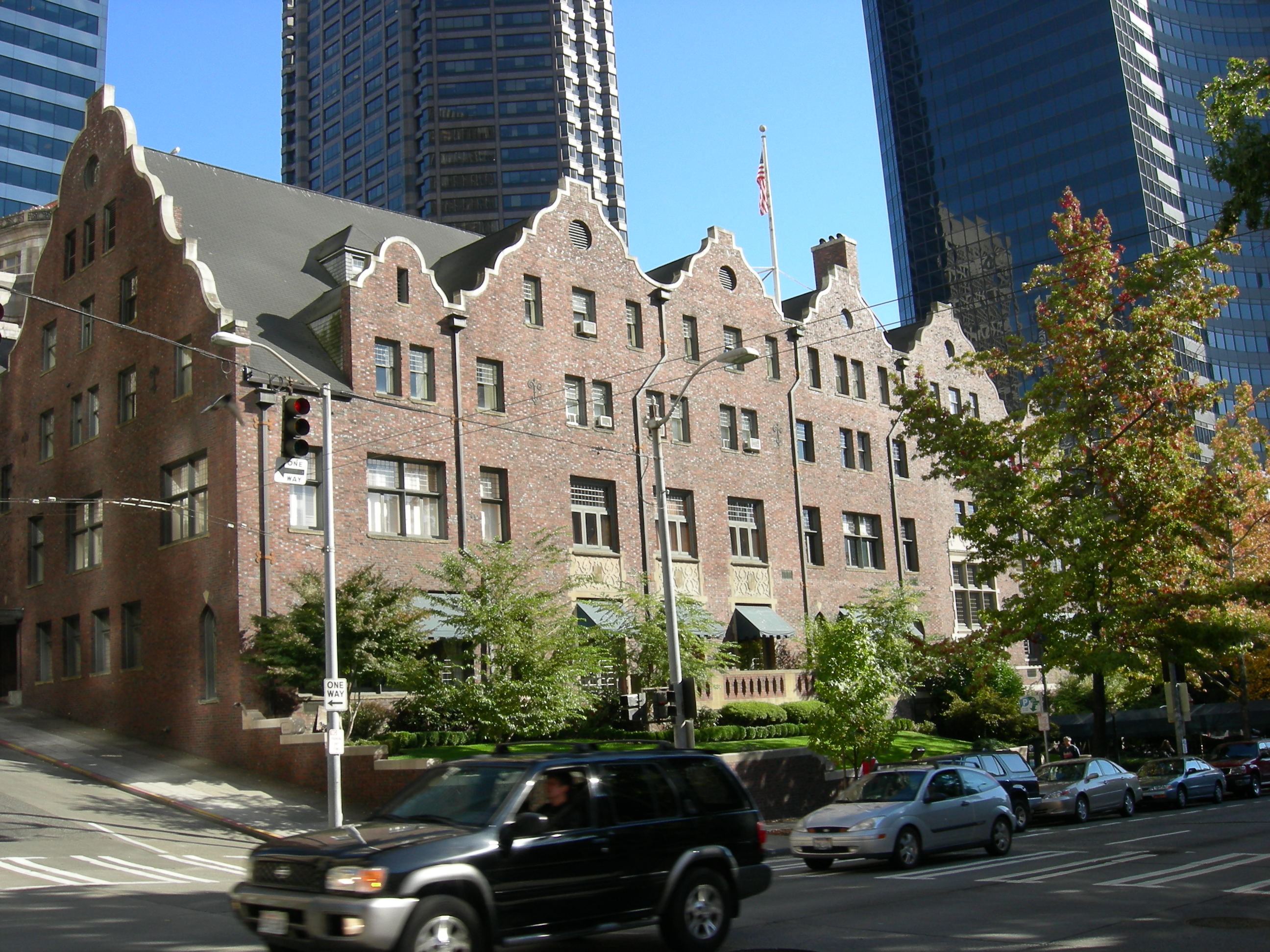
The Rainier Club of Seattle

- America, North and Central:

- Barbados: Barbados Yacht Club, Bridgetown (1924).
- Bermuda: Royal Bermuda Yacht Club, Hamilton (1844).
- Canada:

- Alberta: Cypress Club, Medicine Hat (1903); Ranchmen's Club of Calgary, Calgary (1891).
- British Columbia: Terminal City Club, Vancouver (1899); Union Club of British Columbia, Victoria (1879); Vancouver Club, Vancouver (1889).
- Manitoba: Manitoba Club, Winnipeg (1874).
- Nova Scotia: Halifax Club, Halifax (1862).
- Ontario: London Club, London (1880); National Club, Toronto (1874); Rideau Club, Ottawa (1865); Windsor Club, Windsor (1903).
- Quebec: Forest & Stream Club, Montreal (1884); University Club of Montreal, Montreal (1907).
- Saskatchewan: Saskatoon Club, Saskatoon (1907).

- Costa Rica: Costa Rica Country Club, San José (1940).
- Guatemala: Club Guatemala, Guatemala City (1897).
- Mexico: Club de Banqueros de México, Mexico City (1990); University Club of Mexico, Mexico City (1905).
- Nicaragua: Club Terraza, Managua (1931).
- Puerto Rico: Club Nautico de San Juan, San Juan (1930).
- Sint Maarten: Sint Maarten Yacht Club, Simpson Bay (1980).
- United States of America:

- Arizona: University Club of Phoenix, Phoenix (1965).
- Arkansas: 1836 Club, Little Rock (2016).
- California: The Athenaeum at the California Institute of Technology, Pasadena (1930); California Yacht Club, Marina del Rey (1922); Los Angeles Athletic Club, Los Angeles (1880); Marina City Club, Marina del Ray (2013); Petroleum Club of Bakersfield, Bakersfield (1952); Presidio Golf and Concordia Club, San Francisco (1905); Riviera Country Club, Pacific Palisades (1926); Topa Tower Club, Oxnard (2010).
- Colorado: Denver Athletic Club, Denver (1884).
- Connecticut: Elm City Club, New Haven (1892); Thames Club, New London (1869).
- Delaware: University and Whist Club, Wilmington (1891).
- District of Columbia: Army and Navy Club, Washington D.C. (1891); Arts Club of Washington, Washington D.C. (1916); DACOR Bacon House, Washington D.C. (1952); Sulgrave Club, Washington D.C. (1932).
- Florida: Governors Club, Tallahassee (1982); University Club of Tampa, Tampa (1946).
- Georgia: Chatham Club, Savannah (1968); Indian Hills Country Club, Marietta (1969); Pinnacle Club, Augusta (1965).
- Hawaii: Pacific Club, Honolulu (1851).
- Idaho: Arid Club, Boise (1890).
- Illinois: Standard Club, Chicago (1869); Union League Club of Chicago, Chicago (1879).
- Indiana: Columbia Club, Indianapolis (1889).
- Iowa: Des Moines Embassy Club, Des Moines (1909); Embassy Club West, Des Moines (2010).
- Kentucky: Metropolitan Club, Covington (1991).
- Maryland: Center Club, Baltimore (1962).
- Maine: Cumberland Club, Portland (1877).
- Minnesota: University Club of St. Paul, St. Paul (1912).
- New Hampshire: One Hundred Club, Portsmouth (2003).
- New York: Genesee Valley Club, Rochester (1885); Montauk Club, New York City (1889); New York Athletic Club, New York City (1868); Penn Club, New York City (1901); The Players, New York City (1888); Princeton Club, New York City (1866).
- North Carolina: Charlotte City Club, Charlotte (1947).
- Ohio: Cincinnati Athletic Club, Cincinnati (1853); Toledo Club, Toledo (1889).
- Oregon: University Club of Portland, Portland (1898).
- Pennsylvania: Allegheny Harvard-Yale-Princeton Club, Pittsburgh (1930); Racquet Club of Philadelphia, Philadelphia (1889).
- Tennessee: Walden Club, Chattanooga (1975).
- Texas: Fort Worth Club, Fort Worth (1885); Headliners' Club, Austin (1945).
- Washington: Rainier Club, Seattle (1888); Spokane Club, Spokane (1890).

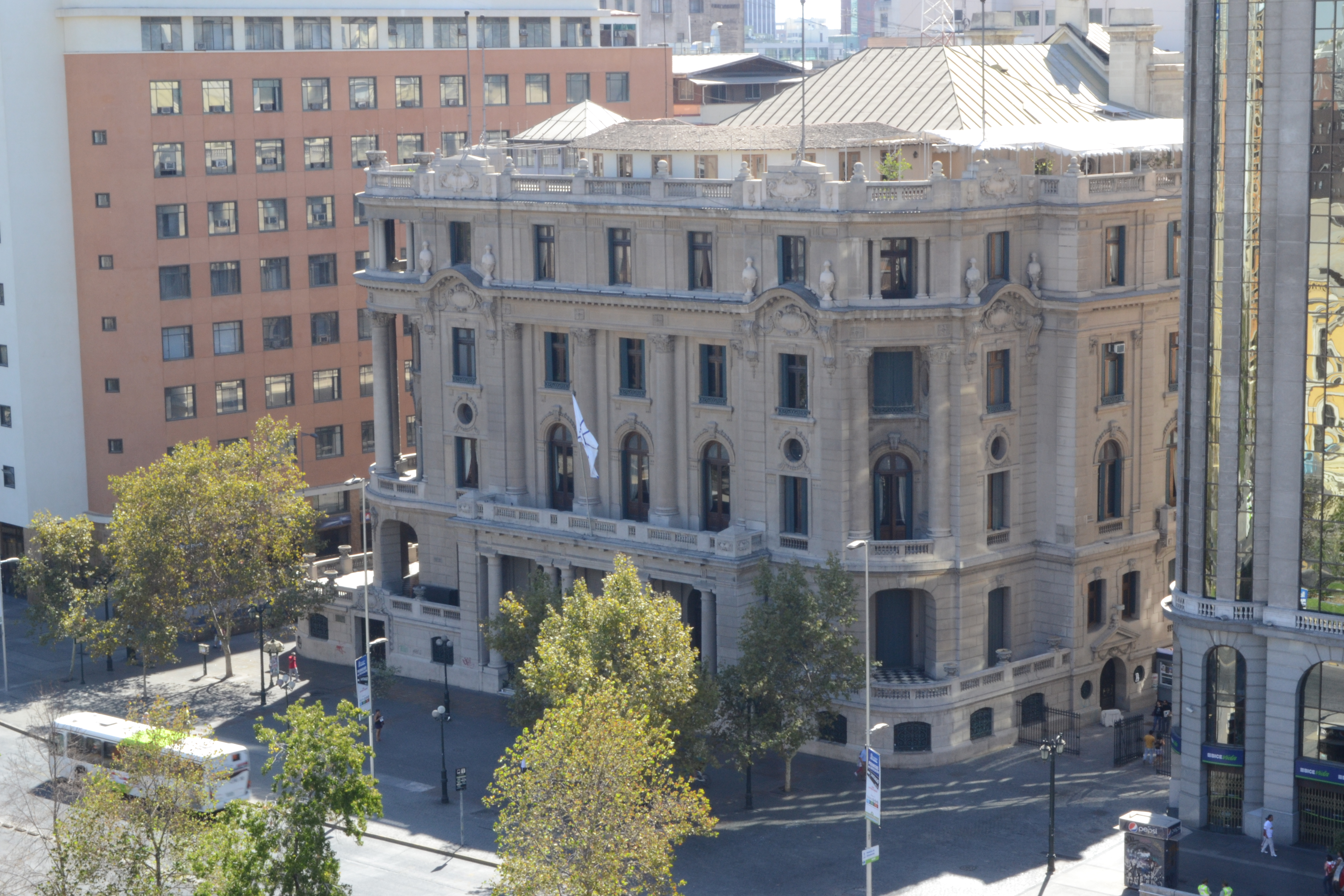
The Club de la Unión of Santiago

- America, South:

- Argentina: Círculo Militar, Buenos Aires (1881).
- Bolivia: Círculo de la Unión, La Paz (1932).
- Chile:

- Magallanes y Antártica Chilena: Club de la Unión, Punta Arenas (1890).
- Santiago: Club de la Unión, Santiago (1868).
- Valparaíso: Club Naval, Valparaíso (1885).

- Ecuador: Club de la Unión, Guayaquil (1869).
- Guyana: Georgetown Club, Georgetown (1858).
- Uruguay: Club Uruguay, Montevideo (1885).

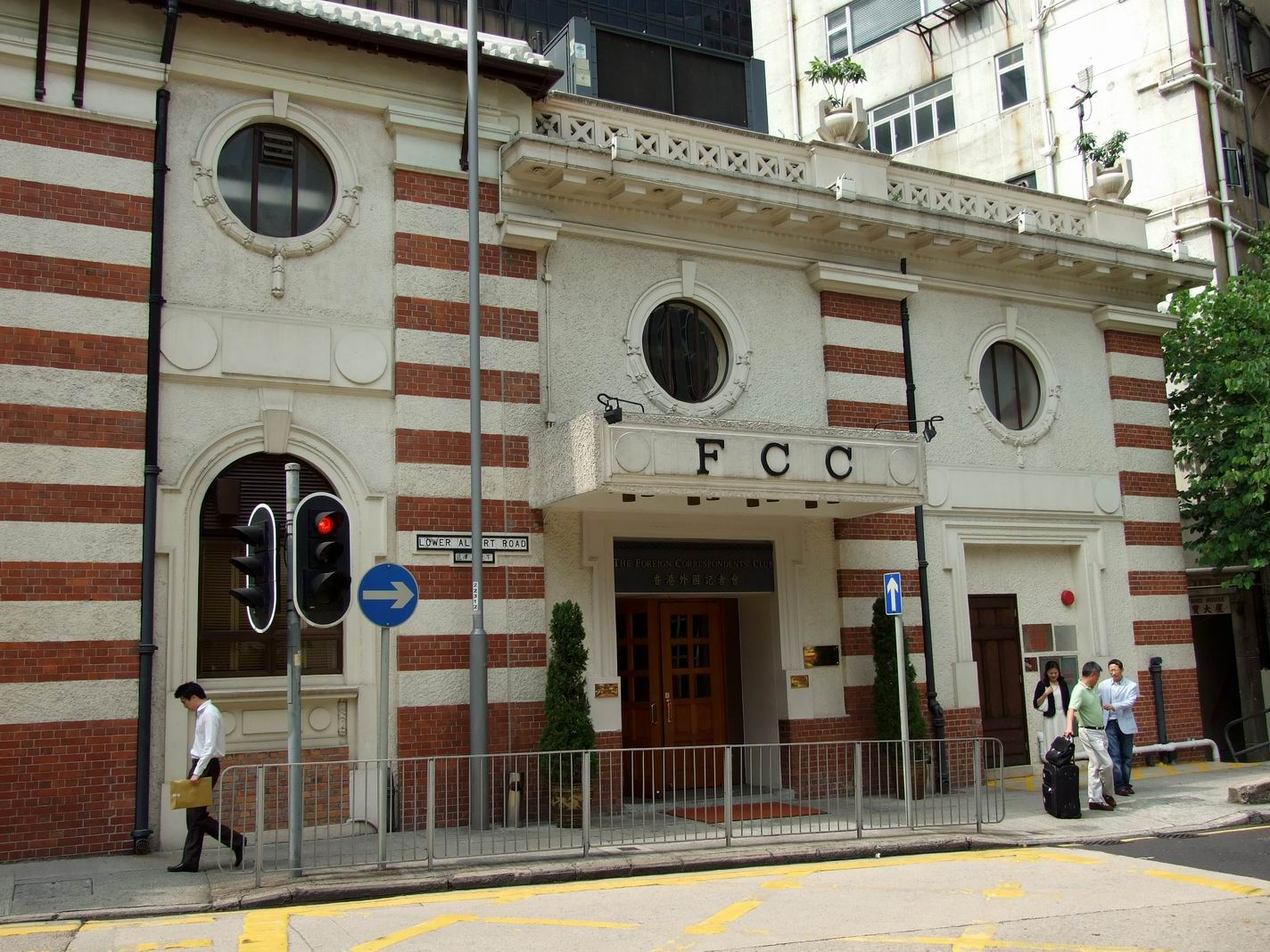
The Foreign Correspondents' Club of Hong Kong

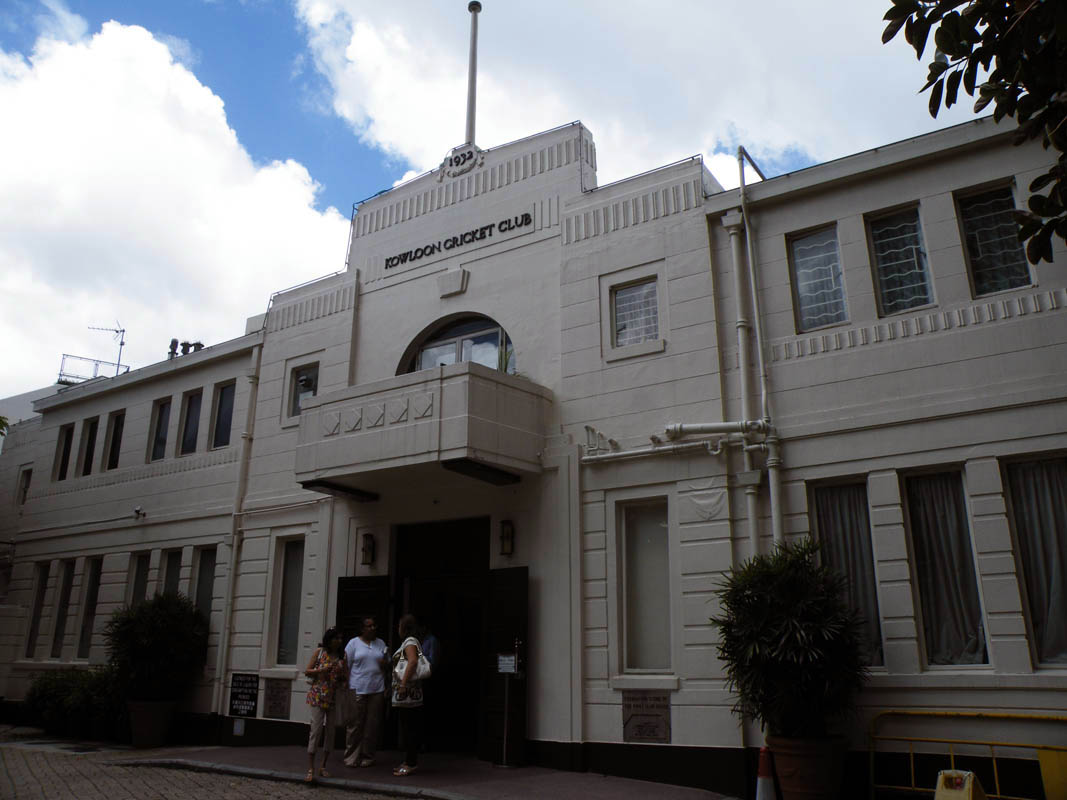
The Kowloon Cricket Club of Hong Kong

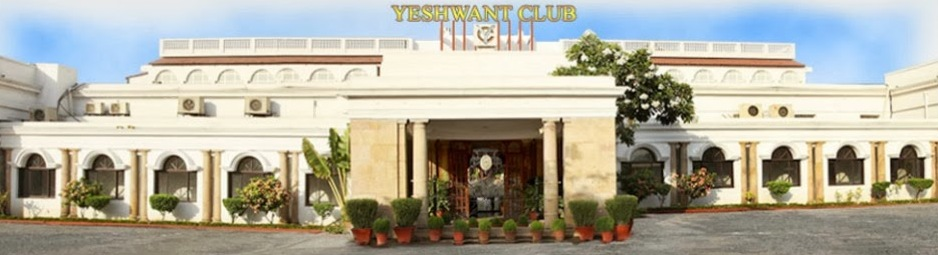
The Yeshwant Club of Indore

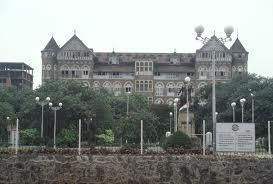
The Royal Bombay Yacht Club of Mumbai, as seen from the Gateway of India

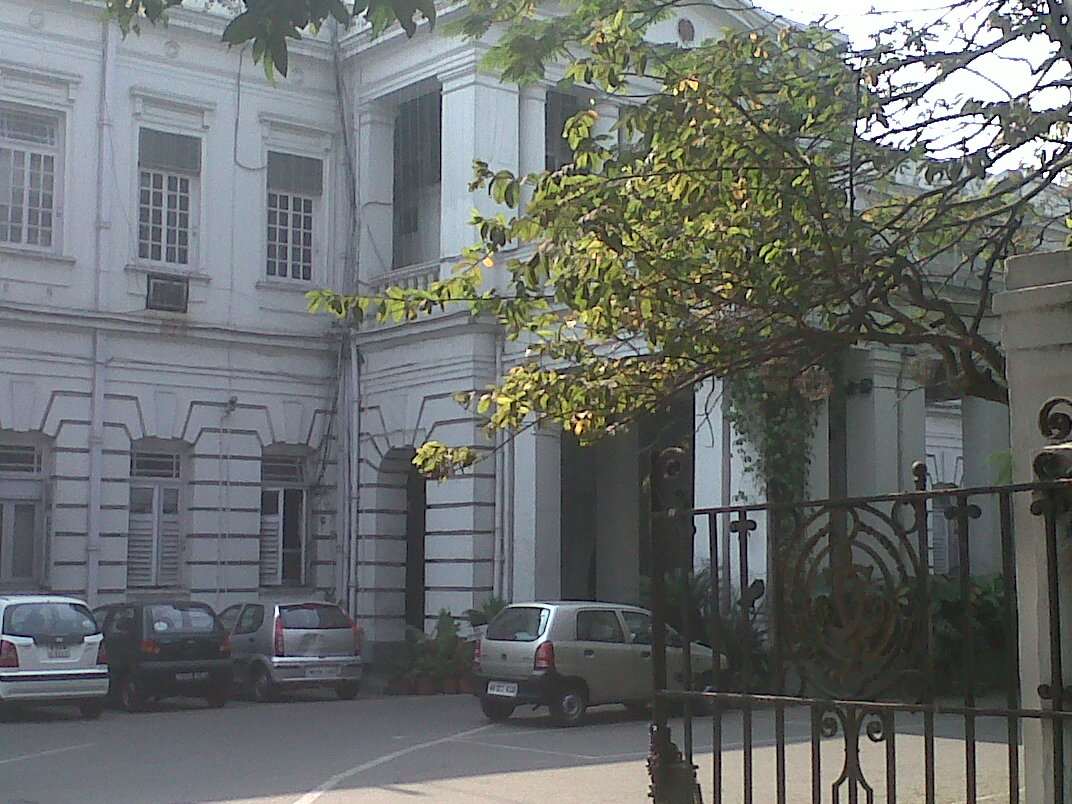
The Calcutta Club of Kolkata

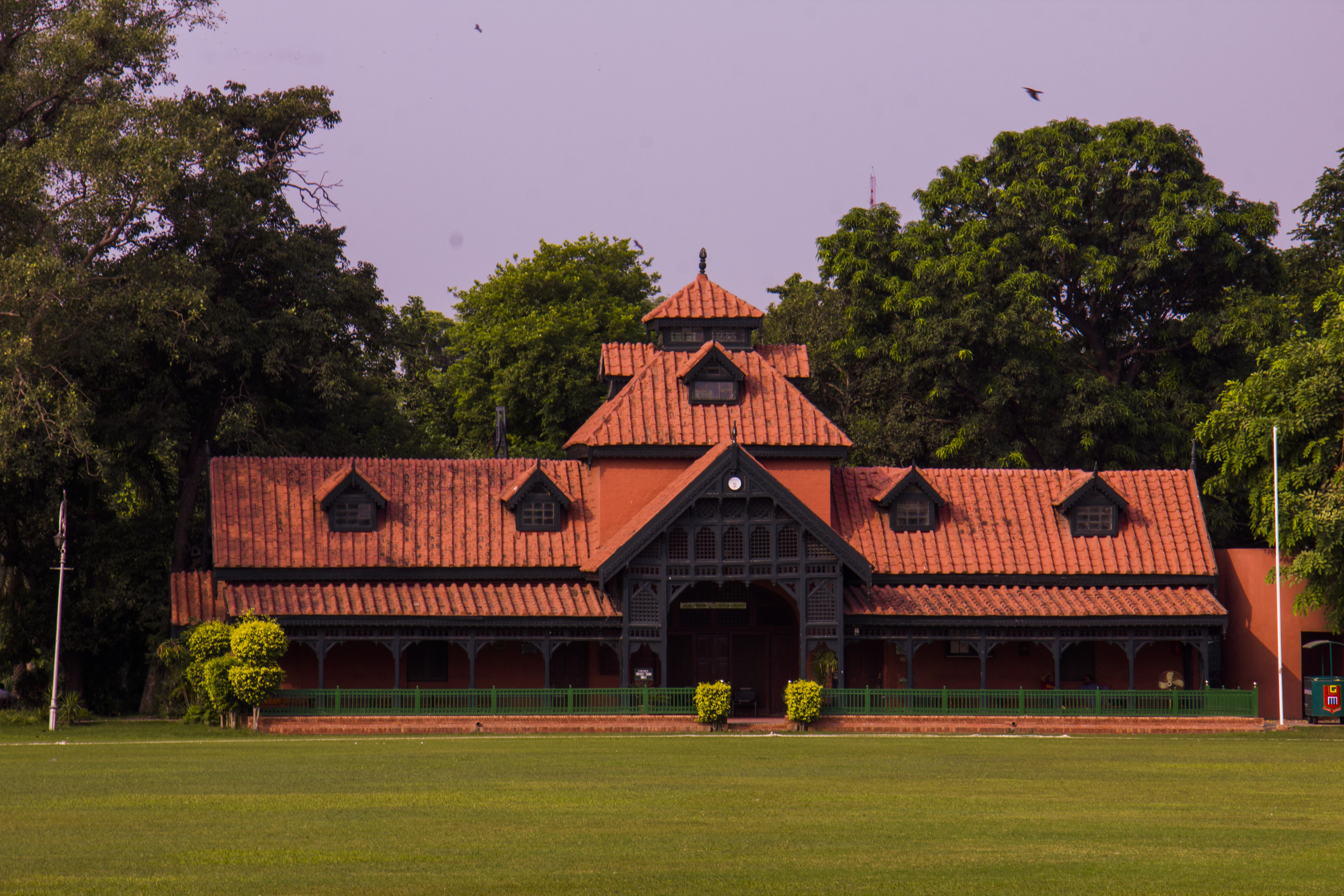
The Lahore Gymkhana Club

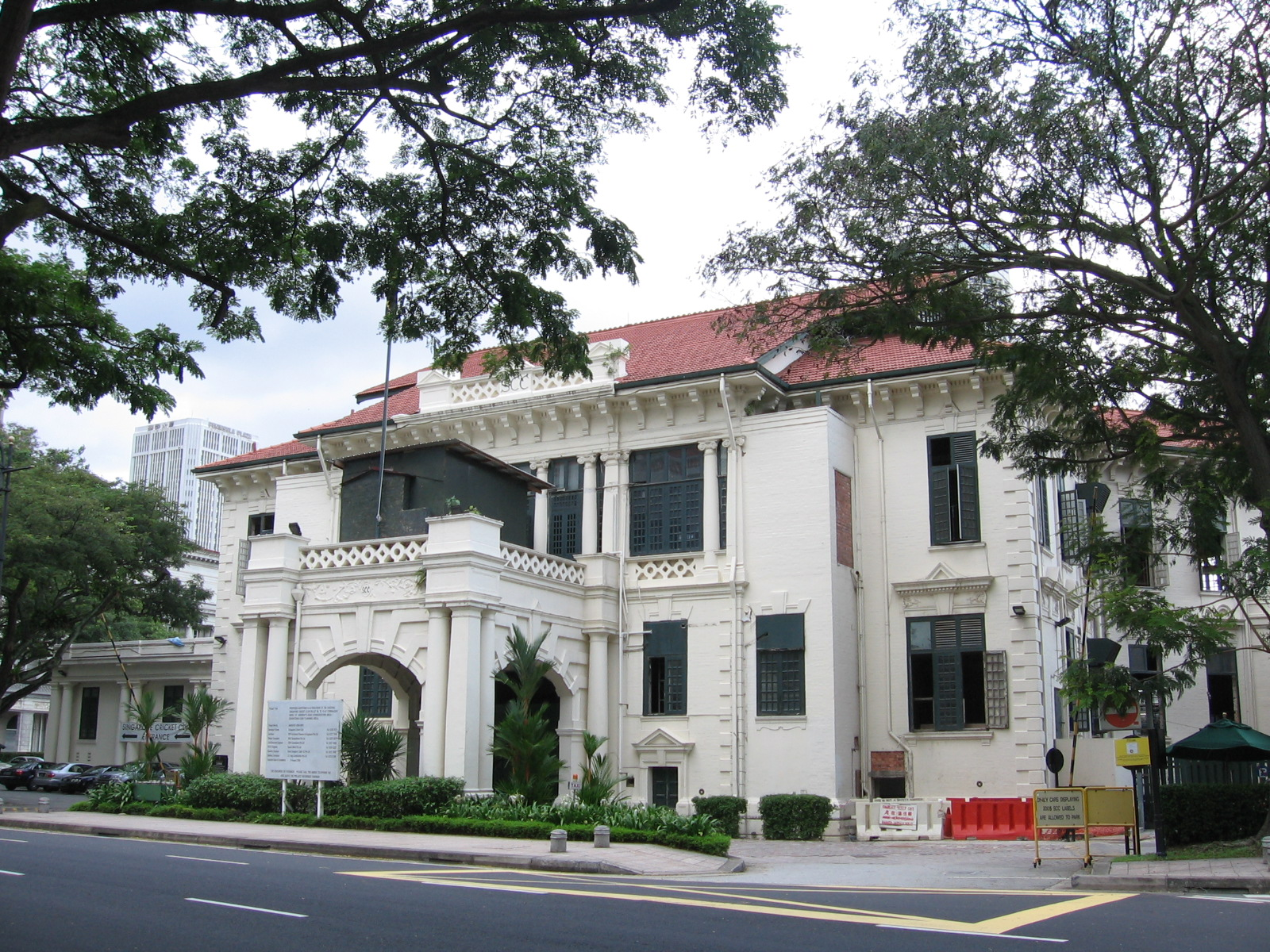
The Singapore Cricket Club

- Asia:

- Bahrain: British Club, Manama (1835).
- Bangladesh: Chittagong Club, Chittagong (1878).
- Cambodia: Vault Club, Phnom Penh (2012).
- China:

- Beijing: Beijing Riviera Country Club, Beijing (2010); Capital Club, Beijing (1994).
- Hong Kong: Foreign Correspondents' Club, Hong Kong (1943); Helena May Club, Hong Kong (1916); Kowloon Cricket Club, Kowloon (1904).
- Shanghai: Roosevelt Club, Shanghai (2010); Shanghai Racquet Club, Shanghai (2000); Shanghai Town & Country Club, Shanghai (2013).

- India:

- Bihar: Bankipore Club, Patna (1865).
- Delhi National Capital Territory: Delhi Gymkhana Club, New Delhi (1913).
- Goa: Clube Tennis de Gaspar Dias, Panaji (1926).
- Gujarat: Piyush Palace Club, Ahmedabad (2013).
- Kerala: High Range Club, Munnar (1905); Lotus Club, Kochi (1931).
- Karnataka: Bamboo Club, Mekur Hosakeri (1884); Bangalore Club, Bangalore (1868); Century Club, Bangalore (1917); Mangalore Club, Mangalore (1876).
- Madhya Pradesh: Yeshwant Club, Indore (1934).
- Maharashtra: Central Provinces Club, Nagpur (1901); Poona Club, Pune (1886); PYC Hindu Gymkhana, Pune (1906); Royal Bombay Yacht Club, Mumbai (1846); Royal Connaught Boat Club, Pune (1868); Willingdon Sports Club, Mumbai (1917).
- Meghalaya: Shillong Club, Shillong (1878).
- Punjab: Lodhi Club, Ludhiana (1995).
- Rajasthan: Emerald Garden Club (2004); Golden Days Club, Jaipur (1996); Jaisal Club, Jaisalmer (2000); Jodhpur Presidency Club, Jodhpur (2017); Umed Club, Jodhpur (1922).
- Tamil Nadu: Coonoor Club, Coonoor (1885); Cosmopolitan Club, Chennai (1873); Madras Boat Club, Chennai (1867); Presidency Club, Chennai (1929); Wellington Gymkhana Club, Wellington (1875).
- Telangana: Secunderabad Club, Secunderabad (1878).
- Uttar Pradesh: Oudh Gymkhana Club, Lucknow (1933); Stellar Gymkhana, Greater Noida (2005).
- West Bengal: Bengal Club, Kolkata (1827); Calcutta Club, Kolkata (1907); Calcutta Rowing Club, Kolkata (1858); Saturday Club, Kolkata (1875); Tollygunge Club, Kolkata (1895).

- Indonesia: Mercantile Athletic Club, Jakarta (1992).
- Japan:

- Hyōgo: Kobe Club, Kobe (1868).
- Kanagawa: Yokohama Country & Athletic Club, Yokohama (1868).
- Tokyo: International House, Tokyo (1952); Tokyo American Club, Tokyo (1928).

- Jordan: King Hussein Club, Amman (1959).
- Malaysia:

- Federal Territory: Royal Lake Club, Kuala Lumpur (1890).
- George Town: Penang Club, George Town (1876).
- Sarawak: Sarawak Club, Kuching (1868).
- Selangor: Royal Klang Club, Klang (1901).
- Seremban: Royal Sungei Ujong Club, Seremban (1887).

- Pakistan:

- Balochistan: Quetta Club, Quetta (1891).
- Punjab: Chenab Club, Faisalabad (1910); Lahore Gymkhana Club, Lahore (1878).
- Islamabad Capital Territory: Islamabad Club, Islamabad (1967).
- Sindh: Karachi Gymkhana, Karachi (1886).

- Philippines: Manila Club, Manila (1832).
- Singapore: British Club, Singapore (1983); Raffles Marina Club, Singapore (1994); Singapore Cricket Club, Singapore (1852); Tower Club, Singapore (1997).
- South Korea: Seoul Club, Seoul (1904).
- Sri Lanka:

- Western Province: Colombo Club, Colombo (1871); Colombo Swimming Club, Colombo (1938).
- Central Province: Hill Club, Nuwara Eliya (1876).

- Thailand: Bangkok Club, Bangkok (1995); British Club, Bangkok (1903).
- Turkey: Büyük Kulüp, Istanbul (1882).
- United Arab Emirates:

- Emirate of Abu Dhabi: The Club, Abu Dhabi (1962).
- Dubai: World Trade Club, Dubai (1989).

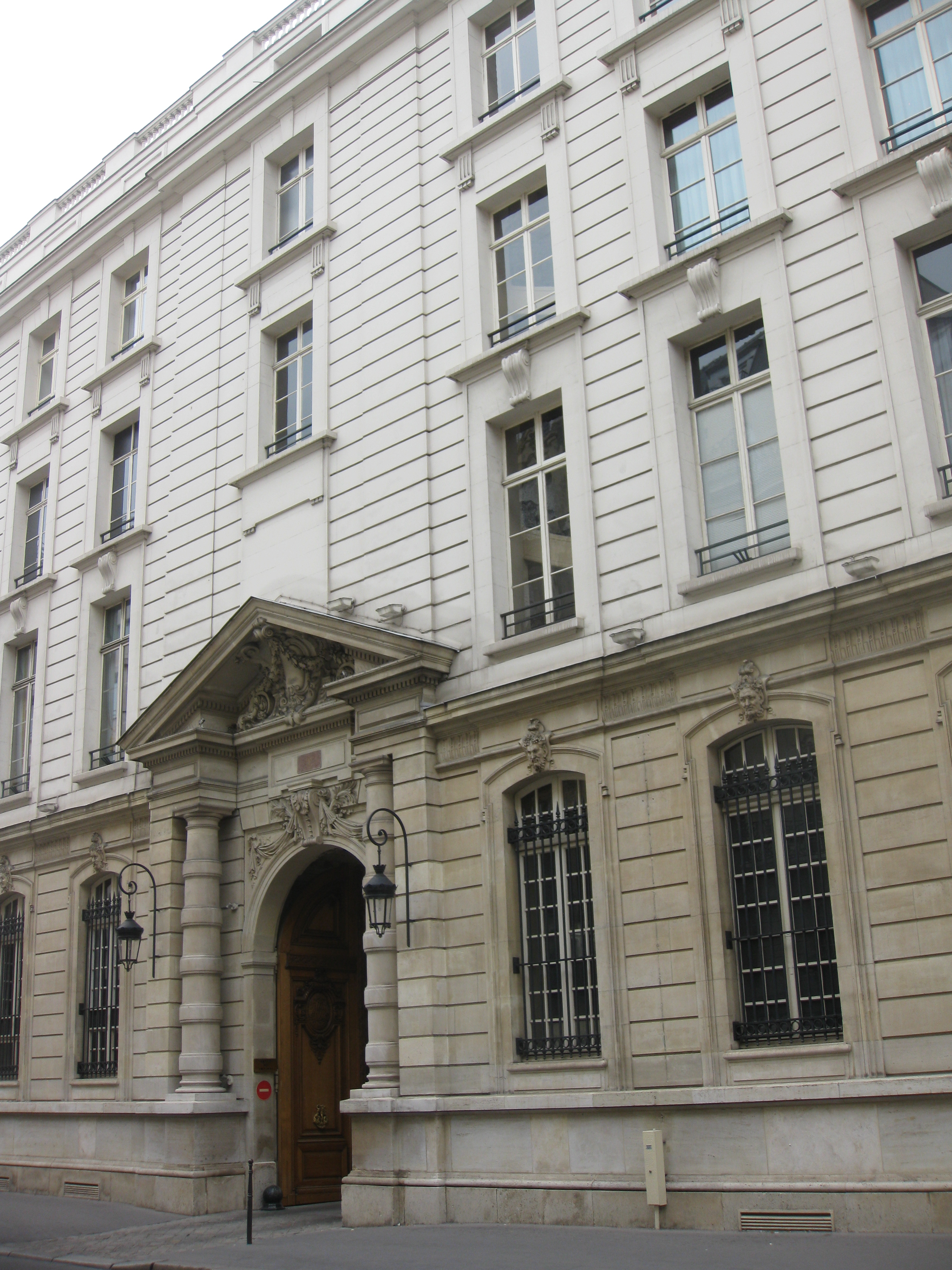
The Cercle de l'Union interalliée of Paris

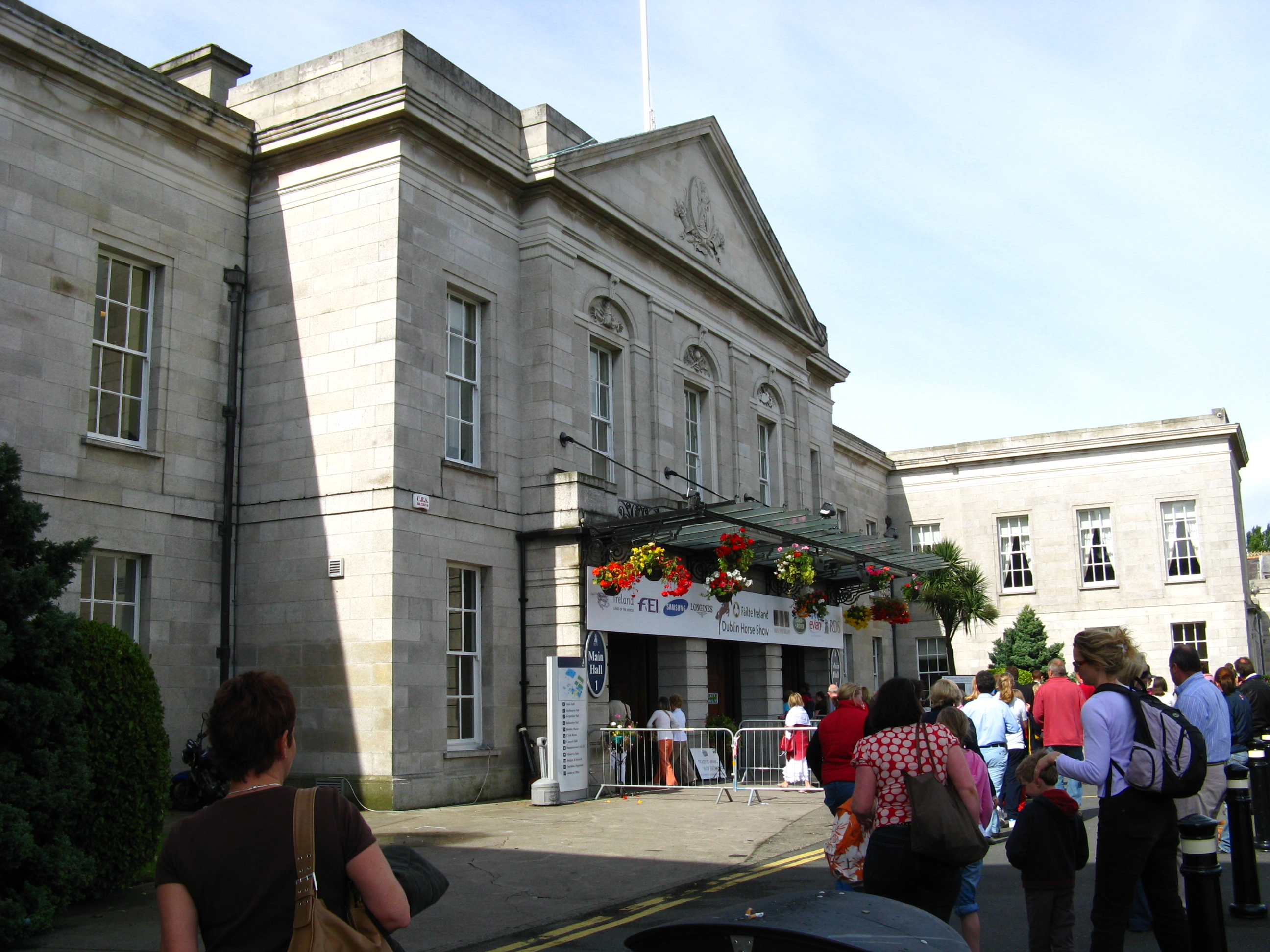
The Royal Dublin Society

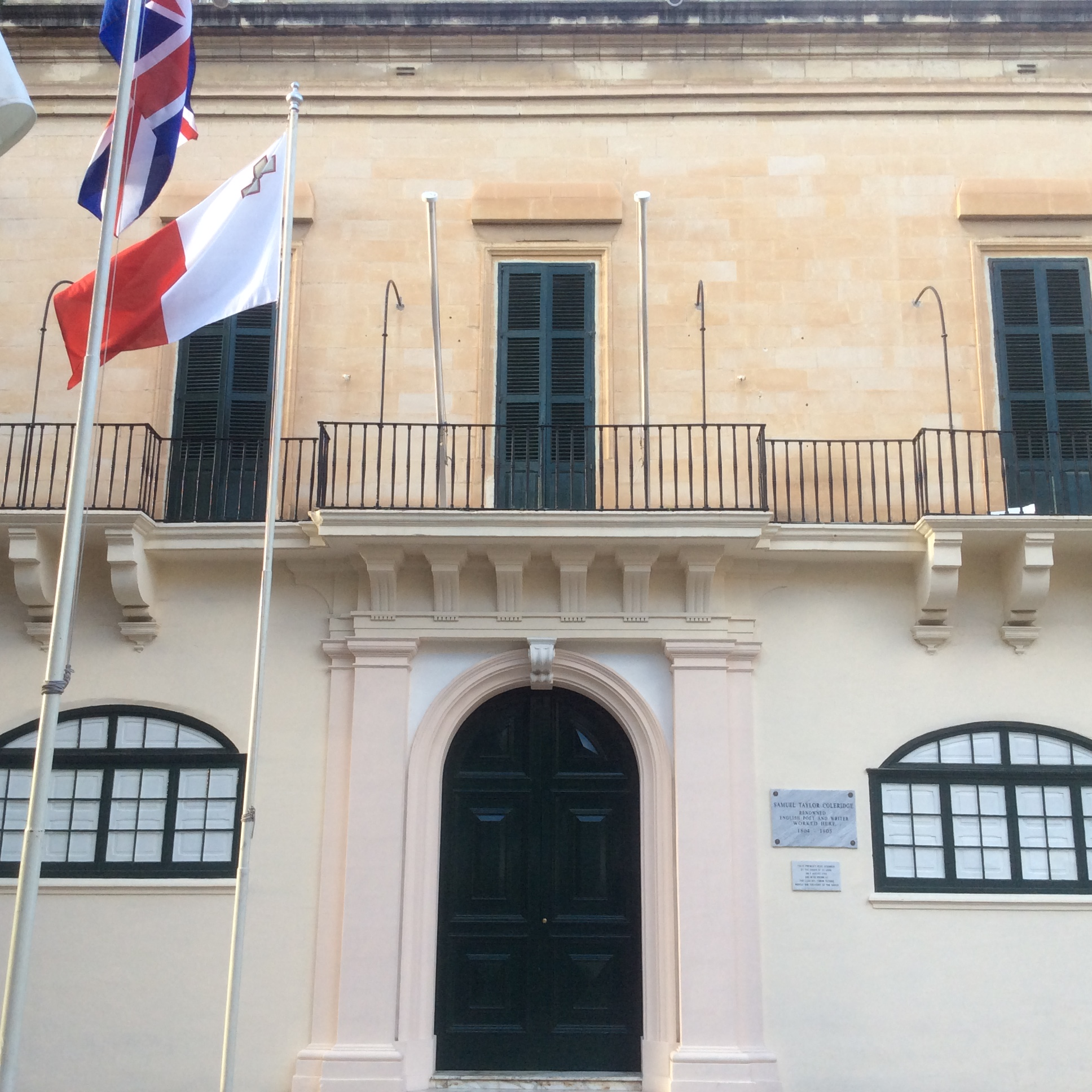
The Casino Maltese of Valletta

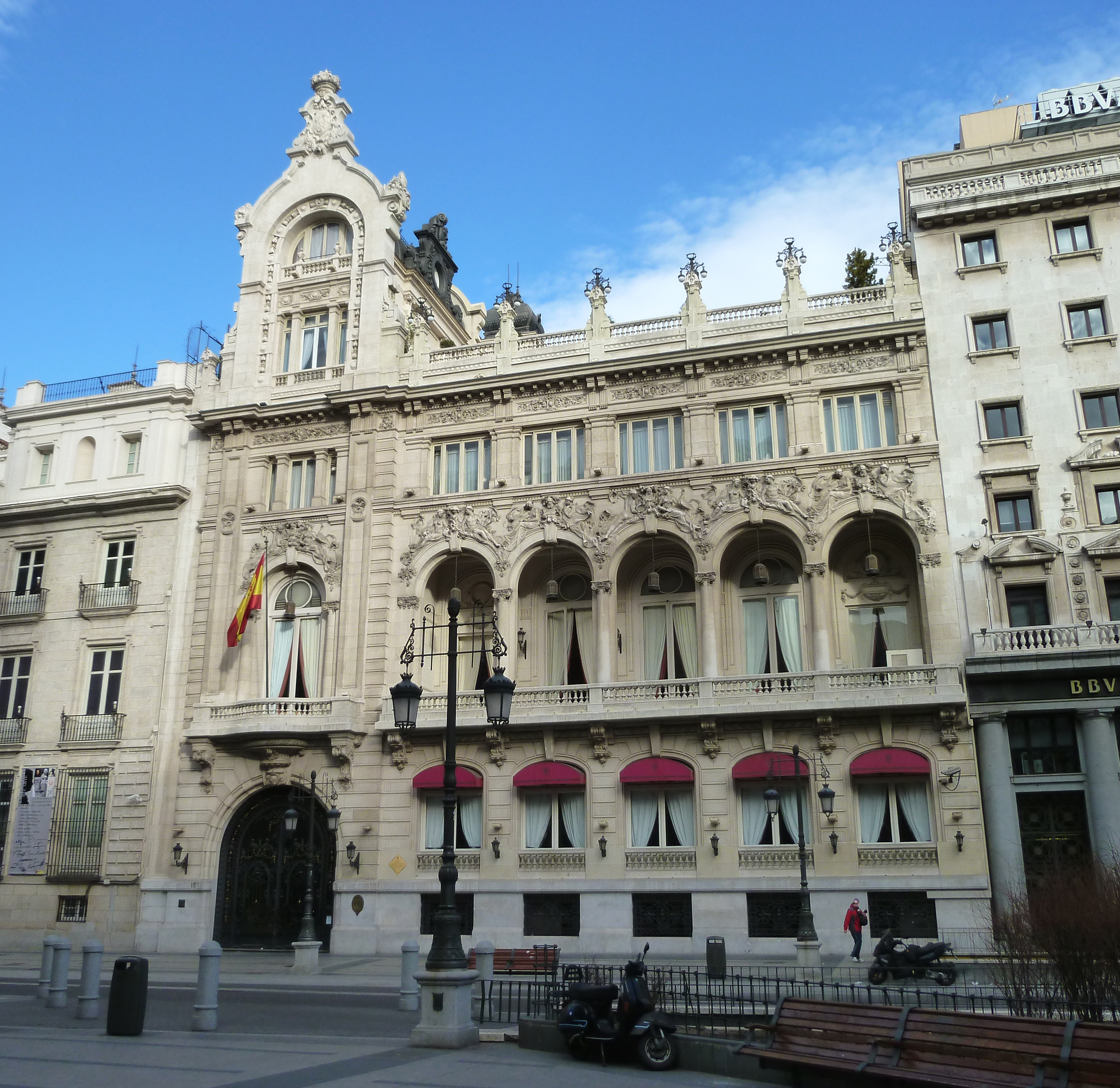
The Casino de Madrid

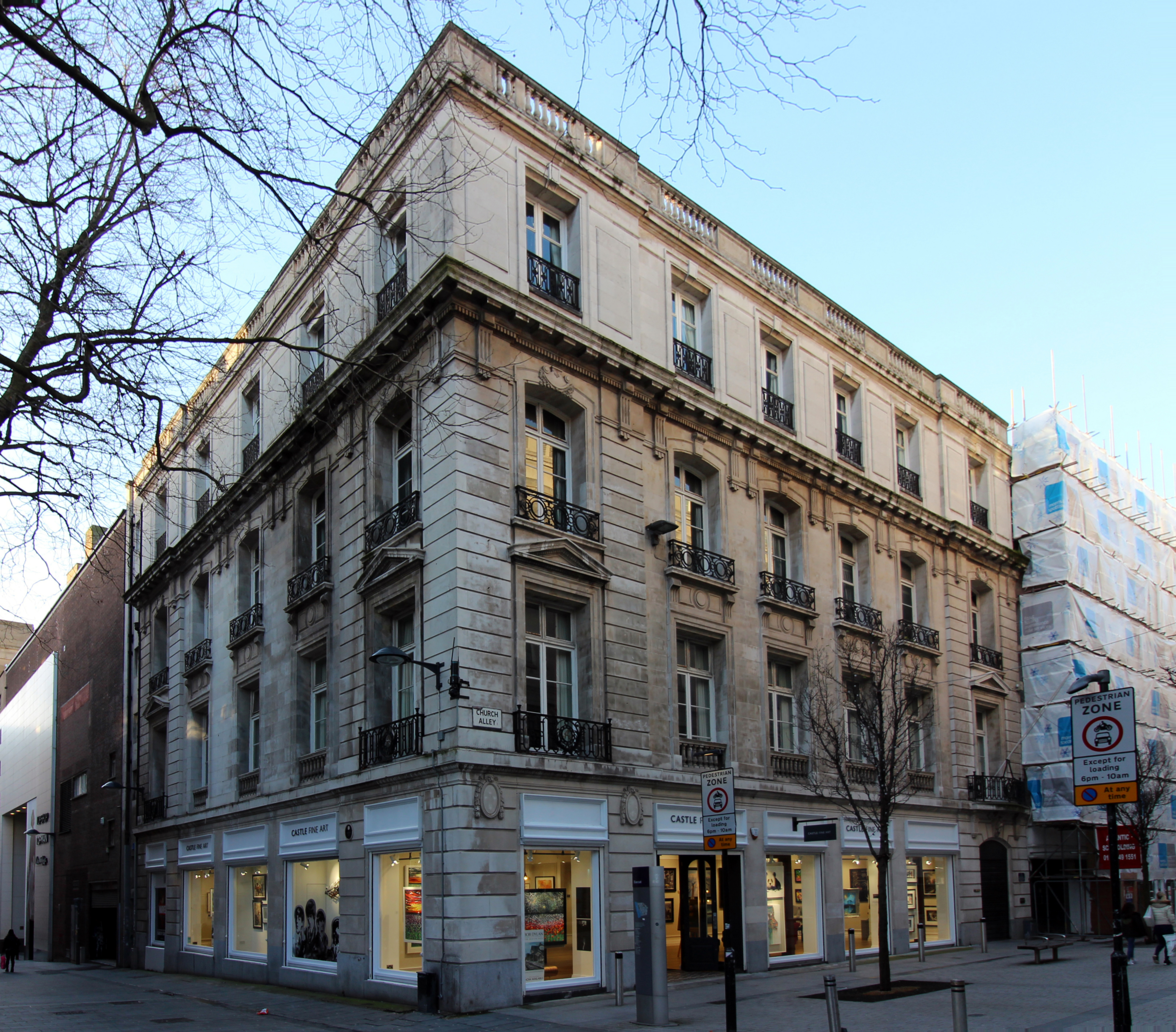
The Athenaeum of Liverpool

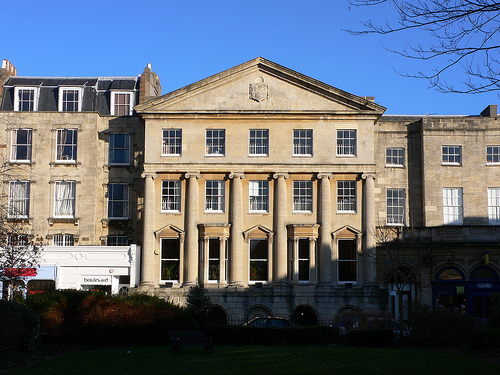
The Clifton Club of Bristol

The Royal Scots Club of Edinburgh

- Europe:

- Austria: Kitzbühel Country Club, Kitzbühel (2013).
- Belgium:

- Brussels-Capital Region: De Warande, Brussels (1988).
- East Flanders: International Club of Flanders, Ghent (1967).
- Walloon: Société Littéraire de Liège, Liège (1779).

- Bulgaria: The Residence Club, Sofia (2011).
- France: Cercle de l'Union interalliée, Paris (1917); Cercle Suédois, Paris (1891).
- Germany:

- Bavaria: Drivers & Business Club, Munich (2019).
- Berlin: International Club, Berlin (1994).
- Hamburg: Business Club, Hamburg (2009).
- Hesse: Airport Club, Frankfurt (2017); Union International Club, Frankfurt (1956).
- North Rhine-Westphalia: Rotonda Business Club, Cologne (2010); Wirtschaftsclub Düsseldorf, Düsseldorf (2003).
- Saxony: Industrieclub Sachsen, Dresden (1990).

- Greece: Piraeus Marine Club, Piraeus (1966).
- Hungary: Brody House, Budapest (2009).
- Ireland: Royal Dublin Society, Dublin (1731); Royal Irish Automobile Club, Dublin (1901); Stephen's Green Hibernian Club, Dublin (1840).
- Italy:

- Campania: Circolo Bononia, Bologna (1929).
- Lombardy: D07 Eco Club House, Milan (2018).
- Umbria: Circolo il Drago, Terni (1928).

- Luxembourg: Cercle Munster, Luxembourg City (1984); House 17, Luxembourg City (2014).
- Malta:

- Central region: Malta Union Club, Sliema (1826).
- South-eastern region: Casino Maltese, Valletta (1852); Marsa Sports Club, Marsa (1888).

- Montenegro: Porto Montenegro Club, Tivat (2007).
- Netherlands:

- North Holland: Koninklijke Groote Industrieele Club, Amsterdam (1788).
- South Holland: Societëit de Witte, the Hague (1802).

- Norway: Shippingklubben, Oslo (1957).
- Portugal:

- Lisbon Coast: Círculo Eça de Queiroz, Lisbon (1940); Grémio Literário, Lisbon (1846).
- Costa Verde: Clube Fenianos Portuenses, Porto (1904); Club Portuense, Porto (1857).

- Spain:

- Andalusia: Círculo Mercantil e Industrial de Sevilla, Seville (1868); Club Camára Antares, Seville (1986); Real Círculo de la Amistad, Córdoba (1854); Real Círculo de Labradores, Seville (1859).
- Aragon: Círculo de Recreo Turolense, Teruel (1866).
- Balearic Islands: Círculo Mallorquín, Palma, Majorca (1851).
- Basque Country: Círculo Vitoriano de Vitoria, Vitoria-Gasteiz (1864); Sociedad Bilbaina, Bilbao (1839).
- Canary Islands: British Club, Las Palmas (1889); Gabinete Literario, Las Palmas (1844); Real Casino de Tenerife (1840).
- Castile and León: Casino Club Nautico La Tertulia, Ponferrada (1970); Casino de Salamanca, Salamanca (1801); Casino de la Union, Segovia (1880); Círculo de la Union de Burgos, Burgos (1881).
- Catalonia: Círculo Ecuestre, Barcelona (1856); Círculo del Liceo, Barcelona (1847).
- Extremadura: Sociedad Casino de Badajoz, Badajoz (1841).
- Galicia: Liceo Casino de Pontevedra, Pontevedra (1855); Sporting Club Casino, A Coruña (1890).
- Madrid: Casino de Madrid, Madrid (1836); Centro Cultural de los Ejércitos, Madrid (1871).
- Murcia: Real Casino de Murcia, Murcia (1847).
- Navarre: Nuevo Casino Eslava, Pamplona (1856).
- Valencia: Casino de Agricultura, Valencia (1859); Círculo Industrial de Alcoy, Alcoy (1868); Real Casino Antiguo de Castellón, Castellón de la Plana (1923).

- Sweden: Militärsällskapet, Stockholm (1852).
- Switzerland: Haute Club, Zurich (2006).
- United Kingdom:

- England:

- Eastern: Bury St Edmunds Farmers Club, Bury St Edmunds (1947); Cambridge Union Society, Cambridge (1815); Hawks' Club, Cambridge (1872); Ipswich and Suffolk Club, Ipswich (1885); Norfolk Club, Norwich (1770); University Pitt Club, Cambridge (1835).
- East Midlands: Northampton & County Club, Northampton (1873); Nottingham Club, Nottingham (1920).
- London: City University Club, London (1895); East India Club, London (1849); Naval and Military Club, London (1862); Oxford and Cambridge Club, London (1821); Walbrook Club, London (2000).
- North East: Northern Counties Club, Newcastle (1829).
- North West: The Athenaeum, Liverpool (1797); Chester City Club, Chester (1807); St. James's Club, Manchester (1825).
- South East: The County Club, Guildford (1882); Hove Club, Hove (1882); Kent and Canterbury Club, Canterbury (1873); Phyllis Court Club, Henley (1906); Vincent's Club, Oxford Union (1863).
- South West: Bath and County Club, Bath (1790); Clifton Club, Bristol (1818); New Club, Cheltenham (1874).
- West Midlands: Potters' Club, Stoke-on-Trent (1951); St. Paul's Club, Birmingham (1859).
- Yorkshire and Humberside: Bradford Club, Bradford (1857); Harrogate Club, Harrogate (1857).

- Northern Ireland:

- County Antrim: Ulster Reform Club, Belfast (1885).
- County Armagh: Armagh County Club, Armagh (1869).

- Scotland:

- Central: Glasgow Art Club, Glasgow (1867); New Club, Edinburgh (1787); Royal Scots Club (1921); Western Club, Glasgow (1825).
- North-East: Royal Northern and University Club, Aberdeen (1854); Royal Perth Golfing Society and County and City Club, Perth (1824).

- Wales: Cardiff and County Club, Cardiff (1866).

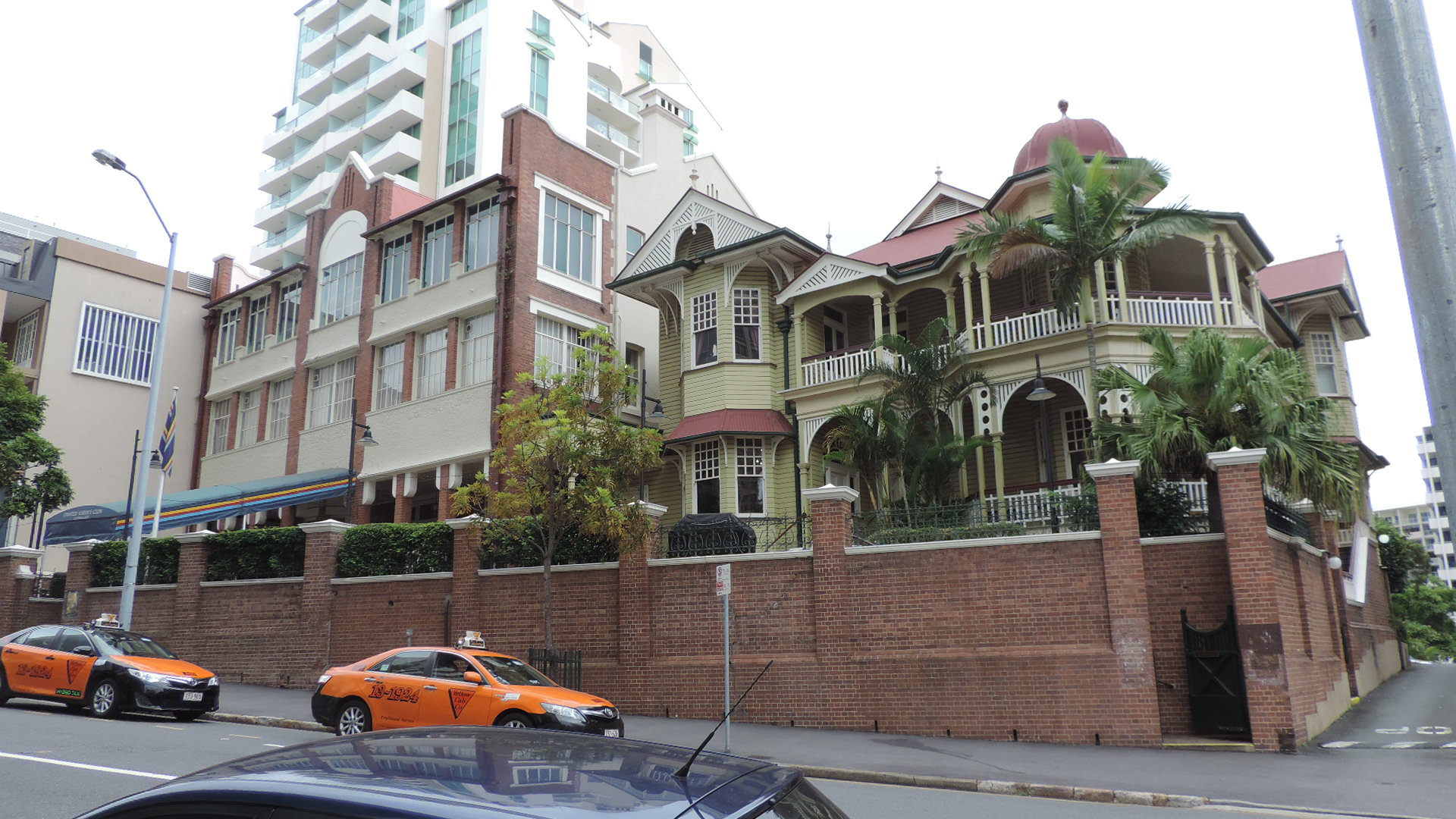
The United Service Club of Brisbane

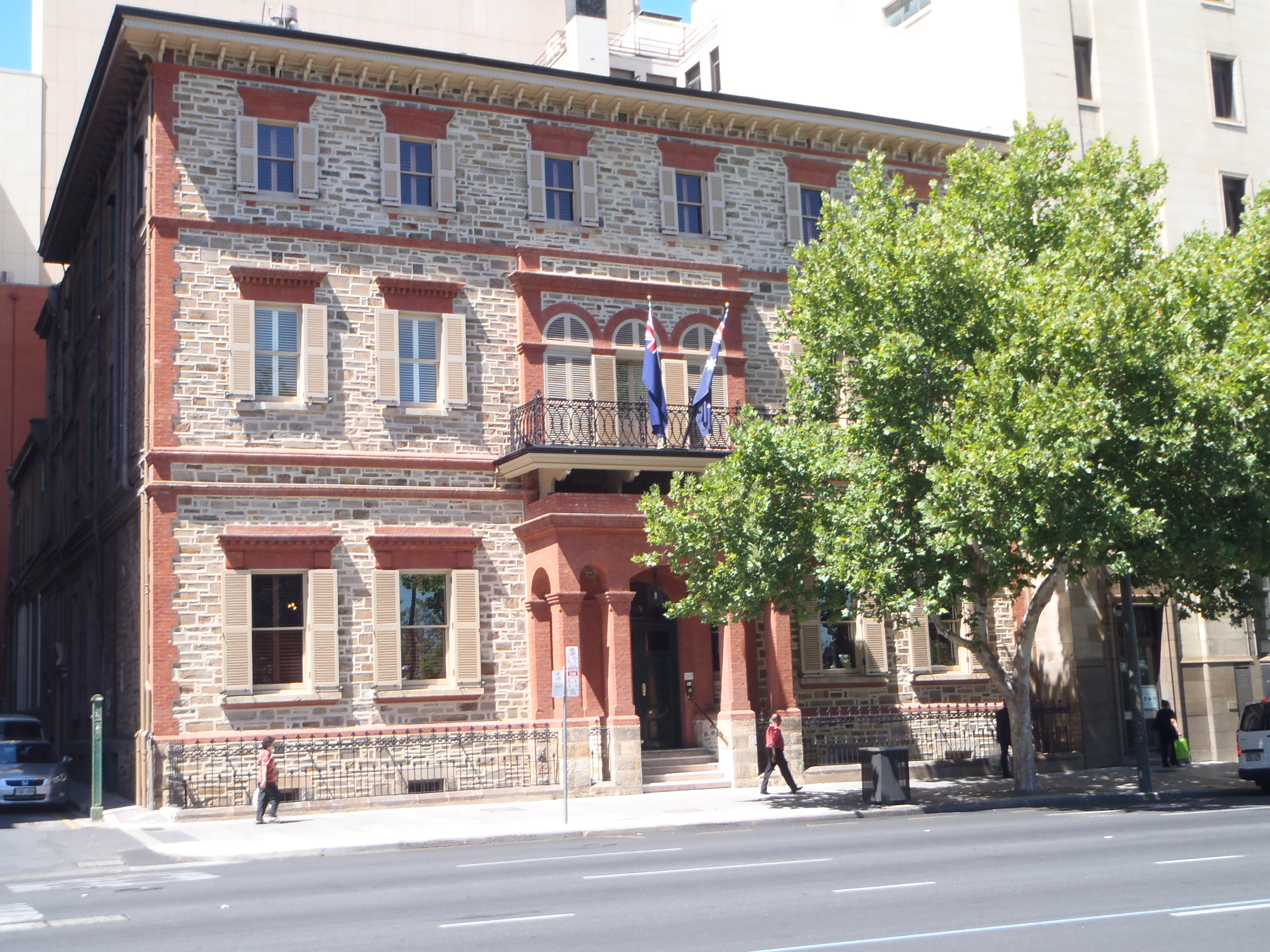
The Adelaide Club

- Oceania:

- Australia:

- Australian Capital Territory: University House, Canberra (1954).
- New South Wales: City Tattersalls Club, Sydney (1895); Newcastle Club, Newcastle (1885); Riverine Club, Wagga Wagga (1881); Royal Automobile Club of Australia, Sydney (1903); Tattersalls Club, Sydney (1858).
- Queensland: Brisbane Club, Brisbane (1903); United Services Club, Brisbane (1892).
- South Australia: Adelaide Club, Adelaide (1863).
- Tasmania: Athenaeum Club, Hobart (1889); Launceston Club, Launceston (1882).
- Victoria: Kelvin Club, Melbourne (1865); Royal Automobile Club of Victoria, Melbourne (1903).

- New Zealand:

- Auckland: Northern Club, Auckland (1869).
- Canterbury: Canterbury Club, Christchurch (1872).
- Hawke's Bay: Hawke's Bay Club, Napier (1863).
- Invercargill: Invercargill Club, Invercargill (1879).
- Otago: Dundedin Club, Dunedin (1858).
- Wellington: Wellington Club, Wellington (1841).

== Presidents ==
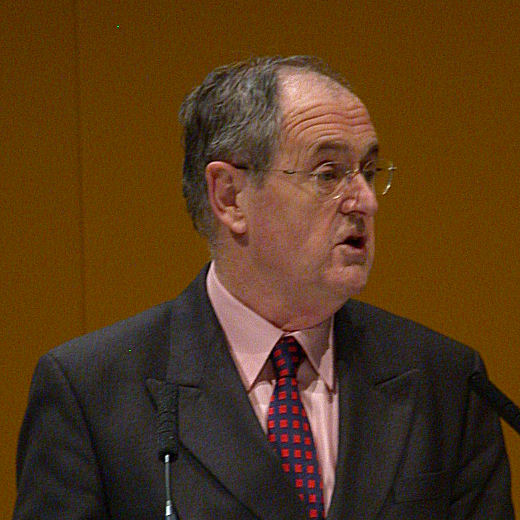
Long-standing Liberal and Lib Dem MP Sir Alan Beith has been the club's president since 2008.

Name	Tenure
The Rt Hon William Ewart Gladstone MP, FRS, FSS†	1882–1898
The Rt Hon The Earl Carrington (later The Most Hon The Marquess of Lincolnshire) KG, GCMG, DL, JP†	1903–1928
The Rt Hon The Earl Beauchamp KG, KCMG	1929–1932
The Rt Hon The Lord Gladstone of Hawarden†	1932–1935
The Most Hon The Marquess of Crewe KG†	1935–1945
The Rt Hon The Viscount Samuel GCB, OM, GBE†	1946–1963
Harold Glanville JP†	1963–1966
The Rt Hon The Lord Rea OBE, DL, JP†	1966–1981
The Rt Hon The Lord Banks CBE	1982–1993
The Rt Revd Eric Kemp, Lord Bishop of Chichester FRHistS	1994–2008
The Rt Hon Sir Alan Beith MP (later The Rt Hon The Lord Beith)	2008–present

†=died in office

== Other groups and clubs absorbed or integrated into the NLC ==
- The short-lived Century Club was absorbed into the NLC on its launch in November 1882.
- The NLC regularly hosted meetings of the pro-Free Trade Cobden Club between the 1880s and 1930s resulting in the NLC and the Cobden Club sharing a very large number of memberships. The NLC absorbed most of the Cobden Club's membership after the Cobden Club's demise.
- Between 1963 and 1965, the Savage Club (named after actor and poet Richard Savage) lodged in some rooms at the NLC, and did so again from 1990 to 2021, lodging in a ground-floor room of the club. In 2020, the Savage Club was served with a year's notice to re-locate by the NLC in 2021, reportedly over NLC members' disapproval of hosting a men-only club within the NLC.
- The Gladstone Club, a Liberal discussion group founded in 1973, continues to meet at the club.
- As noted above, the Liberal Party leased the upper floors of the club as its national headquarters from 1977 to 1988.
- Since 1977, Liberal International has had its international headquarters on the ground floor of the club.
- The John Stuart Mill Institute is a liberal think tank founded in 1992 by several NLC members, which is based at the club and holds occasional lectures there.
- The Liberal Democrat History Group founded in 1994 holds four meetings a year – two at the Lib Dem Spring and Autumn party conferences, and two at the NLC - and while independent, it is embedded as a Circle of the club.
- The monthly Kettner Lunch was originally founded in 1974 by NLC member Sir Peter Boizot and named after the Soho restaurant he owned, which hosted the group; but since Boizot sold Kettner's in 2002, the Kettner Lunch has been meeting at the NLC.
- In 2014, the Authors' Club (which had been founded in the neighbouring Whitehall Court building in 1891, and had previously lodged in the NLC in 1966–76), returned to the club and is now housed there.

== See also ==
- List of London's gentlemen's clubs
