= Gentlemen's club =

Private social club

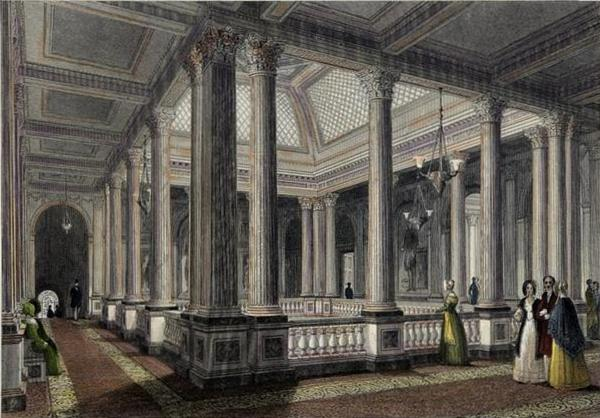
Reform Club, a prominent club in London since the early 19th century

A gentlemen's club is a private social club of a type originally established by men from Britain's upper classes starting in the 17th century.

Many countries and regions outside Britain have prominent gentlemen's clubs, mostly those associated with the British Empire. These include Australia, Bangladesh, Canada, Hong Kong, India, Ireland, Malaysia, New Zealand, Pakistan, Singapore and the United Arab Emirates. There are also many similar clubs in major American cities, especially the older ones. The gentlemen’s club in Moscow (Angliyskoye sobranie, rus. Английское собрание), founded around 1772, was the centre of noble social and political life in the 18th-19th centuries and largely shaped public opinion.

By their nature, gentlemen's clubs were often founded by, and created and reinforced, old boy networks. A typical club contains a bar, a library, one or more parlours for reading, gaming, or socialising, a billiard room, and a formal dining room. Many clubs also contain guest rooms and fitness amenities. Most hold club-related events such as formal dinners. Historically, most were related to some common affiliation or interest, such as gambling, or a shared military service, political outlook, or university. Some are associated mainly with sports.

== History ==
Whenever three or more Englishmen are gathered together, a minimum of two will attempt to form a club from which the others are excluded.

— The author Ben Macintyre

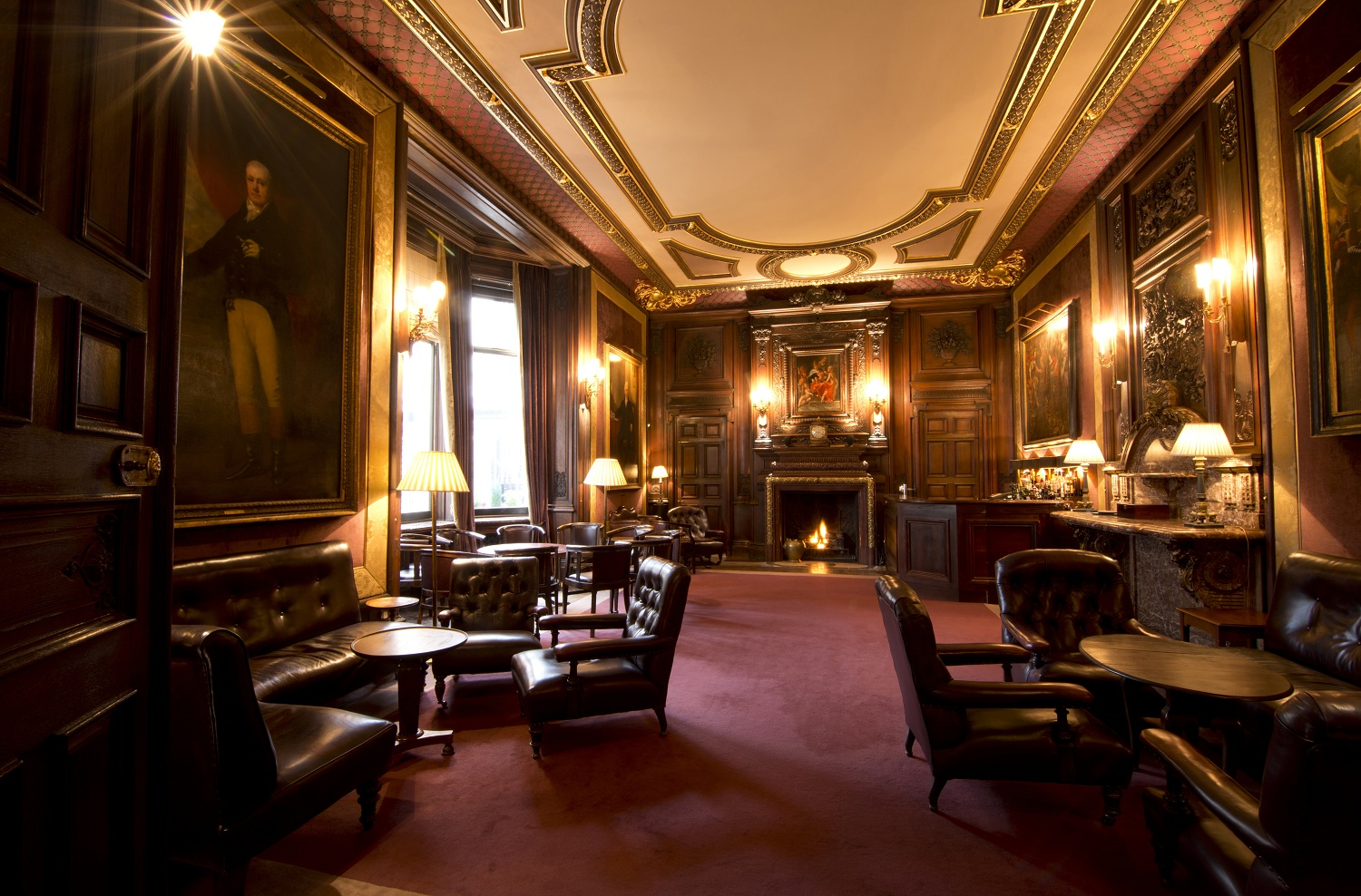
The bar at the Savile Club, 69 Brook Street, London

The original clubs were established in the West End of London. The area of St James's is still sometimes called "clubland". Clubs took over some parts of the role occupied by coffee houses in 18th-century London. The first clubs, such as White's, Brooks's, and Boodle's, were aristocratic, and provided an environment for gambling, which was illegal outside members-only establishments.

The 19th century brought an explosion in the popularity of clubs, particularly around the 1880s. At the height of their influence in the late 19th century, London had over 400 such establishments.

Club Life in London, an 1866 book, begins: "The Club in the general acceptation of the term, may be regarded as one of the earliest offshoots of man's habitual gregariousness and social inclination."

An increasing number of clubs were influenced by their members' interests in politics, literature, sport, art, cars, travel, particular countries, or some other pursuit. In other cases, the connection between the members was membership in the same branch of the armed forces, or the same school or university. Thus the growth of clubs gives some indication of what was considered a respectable part of the "Establishment" at the time.

By the late 19th century, any man with a credible claim to the status of "gentleman" could eventually find a club willing to admit him, unless his character was objectionable or he was "unclubbable" (a word first used by F. Burney). This newly expanded category of English society came to include professionals who had to earn their income, such as doctors and lawyers.

Most gentlemen belonged to only one club, which closely corresponded with the trade or social/political views they identified with, but a few people belonged to several. Members of the aristocracy and politicians were likely to have several clubs. The record number of memberships is believed to have been held by Lord Mountbatten, who had nineteen in the 1960s.

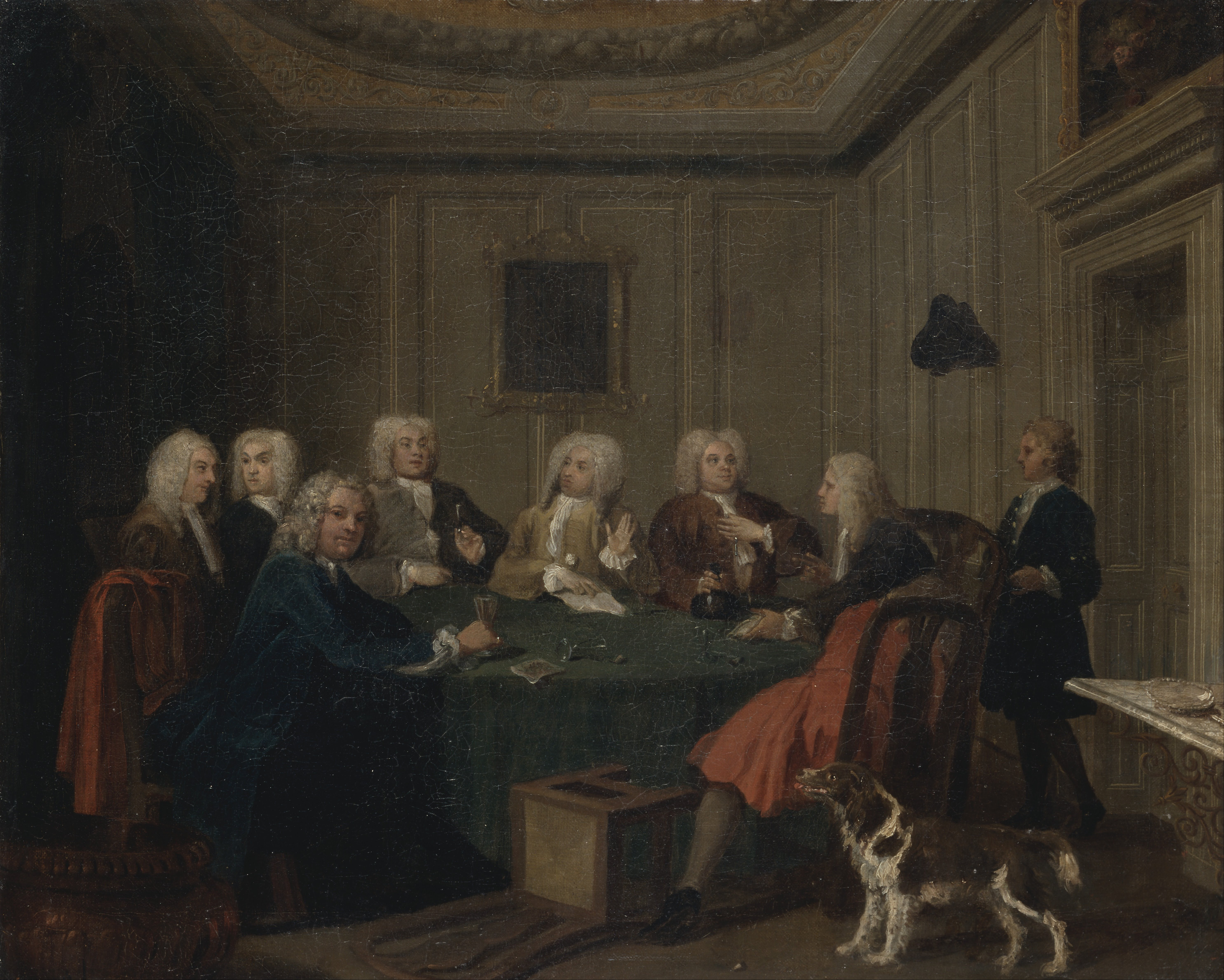
A Club of Gentlemen by Joseph Highmore, c. 1730

Public entertainments, such as musical performances and the like, were not a feature of this sort of club. The clubs were, in effect, "second homes" in central London where men could relax, mix with friends, play parlour games, get a meal, and, in some clubs, stay overnight. Expatriates staying in England could use clubs such as the East India Club or the Oriental Club as a base. They allowed upper- and upper-middle-class men with modest incomes to spend their time in grand surroundings. The richer clubs were built by the same architects as the finest country houses of the time and featured similar interiors. They were a convenient retreat for men who wished to get away from female relations, "in keeping with the separate spheres ideology according to which the man dealt with the public world, whereas women's domain was the home." Many men spent much of their lives at their club, and it was common for young, newly graduated men who had moved to London for the first time to live at their club for two or three years before they could afford to rent a house or flat.

Gentlemen's clubs were private places where men could relax and form friendships with other men. In the 19th and 20th centuries, clubs were regarded as a central part of elite men's lives. They provided everything a regular home would have: dining halls, a library, entertainment and game rooms, bedrooms, bathrooms and washrooms, and a study. Clubs had separate entrances for tradesmen and servants, usually located on the side of the building not easily seen by the public eye. Many clubs had waiting lists, some as long as sixteen years. There is no standard definition of what counts as a gentlemen's club. Each club differed slightly from others.

In the 19th century, the family was considered one of the most important aspects of a man's life. A man's home was his property and should have been a place to satisfy most of his needs. However, it was not always a place that provided privacy and comfort, perhaps because elite families often entertained guests for dinners, formal teas, entertainment, and parties. Their lives were on display, and they were often reported in local papers. A gentleman's club offered an escape from this family world. Another explanation would be that men were brought up in all-male environments in places like schools and sports pastimes, and they became uncomfortable when they had to share their lives with women in a family environment.

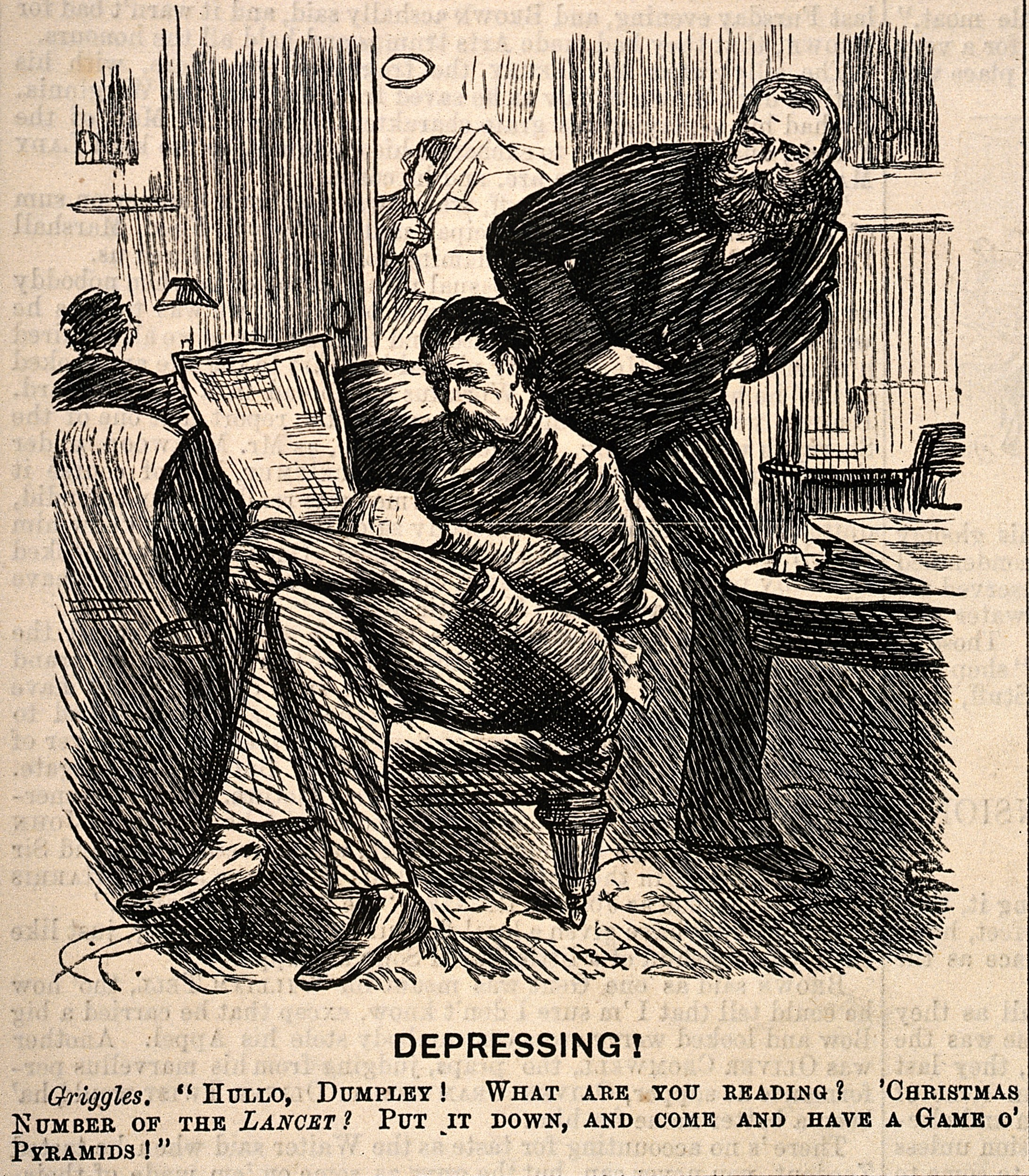
Scene in a gentlemen's club: a cartoon of 1883 by Charles Keene

Men's clubs were also a place for gossip. Through gossip, bonds were created that helped confirm social and gender boundaries. Gossiping helped confirm a man's identity, both in his community and within society at large. It was often used as a tool to climb the social ladder, as it revealed that a man had information others did not. Rules also governed gossip in the clubs. These rules ensured the privacy of the members.

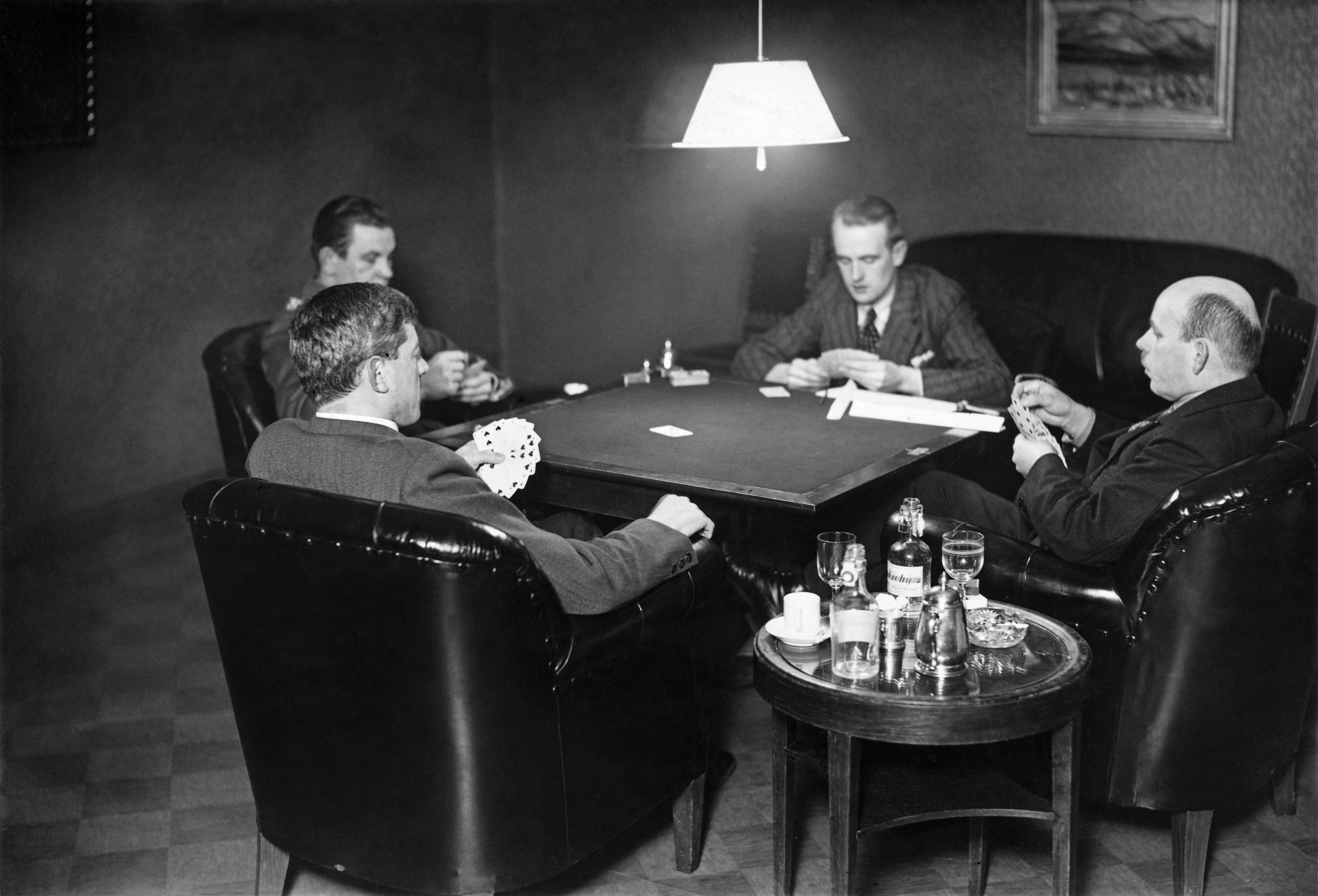
Men are playing with cards at the gentlemen's club of Kuopio in 1932

Until the 1950s, clubs were also heavily regulated in the rooms open to non-members. Most clubs contained just one room where members could dine and entertain non-members; it was often assumed that one's entire social circle should be within the same club. Harold Macmillan was said to have taken "refuge in West End clubs ...: Pratt's, Athenaeum, Buck's, Guards, the Beefsteak, the Turf, [and] the Carlton".

=== Domesticity ===
Although gentlemen's clubs were originally geared towards a male audience, domestic life played a key role in their establishment and continuity. Defying classic gender norms, the club could be represented as "homosocial domesticity". Similar to male coffeehouses of the Ottoman Empire, the clubs were a home away from home. They were alternative, competing spaces in that they shared some similarities with the traditional home. One of the key attractions of these clubs was their private, often exclusive, nature. They were getaways from the tight, restrictive role expected of the stoic gentleman. As in their homes, men could act and behave in ways not usually acceptable in public society.

For men who lived their lives at the club, the home, if any, lost its status as their base. Members would use its address for official documentation, mailing, and appointments. Meals, formal or informal, were provided, and the club staff could cater to tastes. Spaces within the club were designated for these functions, and guest flow could be more easily controlled than at home. Members' social status was marked by the club's prestige, but within it, the lines were blurred. Prominent guests could be invited to dinner or to lounge at the club rather than at the house. Staff would monitor these guests and their arrival for the members and, as the members' employees, could personally tailor the experience. Thus, by holding important events at the club, only the wealth and importance of the club and its amenities were displayed, rather than their possibly inferior possessions or homes.

In English clubs, this domesticity was particularly emphasised. These clubs, primarily in London, were usually very "quiet," and their members were well-behaved—again pointing to the calm familiarity of the household. In addition, club staff were tasked with keeping the club a private space and attempted to control the spread of outside information. Whether from "the streets, the courts, Parliament, or the Stock Exchange," the chaotic nature of work life was put on hold. Young bachelors and other members were in many ways shielded from the true problems of society.

Induction into a club required member approval and payment. Despite opportunities for mobility within the club, patriarchal authority reigned, with power and status concentrated among the ranking members. The result was internal stability. The historian Robert Morris proposed that clubs were "part of the power nexus of capitalism, and essential to the continuity of elite dominance of society."

=== Women ===
Several private members' clubs for women were established in the late 19th century; among them the Alexandra Club, the self-consciously progressive Pioneer Club, the Ladies' Institute, and the Ladies' Athenaeum. They proved quite popular at the time, but only one London-based club, The University Women's Club, has survived as a single-sex establishment.

Traditionally barred from full membership in existing clubs of similar interest, and somewhat mobilised by the passage of the Civil Rights Act of 1964 in the United States; by the 21st century, numerous private women's clubs had formed in support of previously male-dominated pursuits, including professional affiliations and business networking. In 2023 The Daily Telegraph reported that an "[A]bsolutely chilling" discordance around admitting women to men-only clubs persisted in the UK, as the SFGate also reports in the US.

== Modern clubs ==
=== Election to membership ===
Membership is by election after the proposers (at least two and in many clubs more), who have known the candidate for a term of years, formally nominate the person for membership. Election is by a special committee (itself elected), which may interview the candidate and review any support and objections from other members. Some top clubs still maintain distinctions which are often undefined and rarely explained to those who do not satisfy their membership requirements. After reaching the top of a long waiting list, there is a possibility of being blackballed during the committee's formal election process. In these circumstances, the principal proposer of such a person may be expected to resign, as he failed to withdraw his undesirable candidate. More often, the member who proposes an unsuitable candidate will be "spoken to" much earlier by senior committee members and will withdraw his candidate to avoid embarrassment for all concerned.

=== Ownership and governance ===
The clubs are owned by their members and not by an individual or corporate body. These kinds of relationships have been analysed from the network analysis perspective by María Zozaya.

== Distribution ==
Establishments based on the traditional gentlemen's clubs exist throughout the world, predominantly in Commonwealth countries and the United States. Many clubs offer reciprocal hospitality to other clubs' members when travelling abroad.

=== United Kingdom ===
There are perhaps some 25 traditional London gentlemen's clubs of particular note, from The Arts Club to White's. A few estimable clubs (such as the Royal Thames Yacht Club and the Royal Ocean Racing Club) have a specific character that places them outside the mainstream, while other clubs have sacrificed their individuality for the commercial purpose of attracting enough members, regardless of their common interests. (See Club (organisation) for further discussion.) The oldest gentlemen's club in London is White's, founded in 1693. Discussion of trade or business is usually not allowed in traditional gentlemen's clubs, although they may hire out their rooms to external organisations for events.

Similar clubs exist in other British cities, such as:

- New Club in Edinburgh (Scotland's oldest club, founded in 1787)
- the St James's Club - Manchester (founded in 1825)
- the Cardiff and County Club in that city
- the Ulster Reform Club in Belfast
- the Liverpool Athenaeum (founded in 1797 by the art collector and social reformer William Roscoe and friends, and contains a notable library of rare books)
- The Clifton Club in Bristol was founded in 1818 and occupies an imposing building.
- St Paul's Club was formed in 1859 in Birmingham, the first in the Midlands.
- Jersey and Guernsey in the Channel Islands, although outside the UK, each has its own The United Club, founded, respectively, in 1848 and in 1870.

In London, the original gentlemen's clubs exist alongside the late-20th-century private members' clubs such as the Groucho Club, Soho House and Home House, which offer memberships by subscription and are owned and run as commercial concerns. All offer similar facilities, such as food, drink, comfortable surroundings, venue hire, and, in many cases, accommodation. In recent years, the advent of mobile working (using phones and email) has put pressure on traditional London clubs, which frown on—and often ban—the use of mobiles, discourage laptops, and discourage any discussion of business matters or 'work-related papers'. A new breed of business-oriented private members' clubs, exemplified by One Alfred Place and Eight in London or the Gild in Barcelona, combines the style, food and drink of a contemporary private members' club with the business facilities of an office. For this reason, the Institute of Directors acquired one of the older clubhouses in Pall Mall as a more business-friendly option.

=== Ireland ===
Clubs in Ireland include two prominent Dublin social clubs, each having both male and female members, a range of facilities and events, and a wide network of reciprocal clubs: The Kildare Street and University Club (formed on the merger of Kildare Street Club (traditionally Conservative) with The Dublin University Club (academic)) and The St Stephen's Green Hibernian Club (similarly formed when the St Stephen's Green Club (Whig) merged with The Hibernian United Services Club (military)). A number of other, specialist clubs flourish in Dublin such as The Royal Irish Automobile Club (R.I.A.C) on Dawson Street, Established in 1901, The United Arts Club, Royal Irish Academy, Royal Dublin Society, Yacht Clubs (The Royal Irish, The National, and The Royal St George) of Dún Laoghaire, The Hibernian Catch Club (catch music), and The Friendly Brothers of St Patrick (originally anti-duelling).

=== United States ===
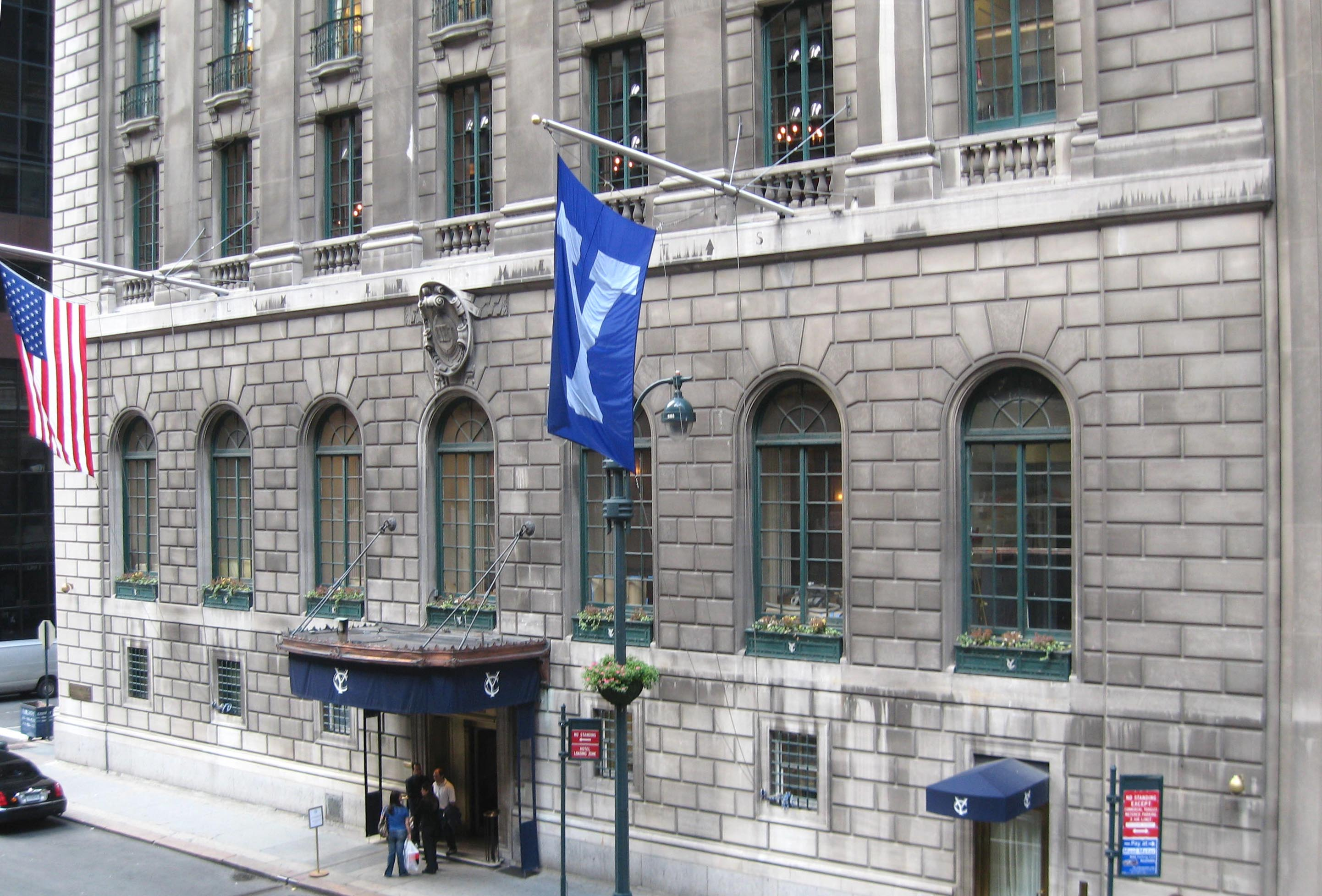
The Yale Club of New York City, founded in 1897, is the largest gentlemen's club in the world, and now includes women among its members

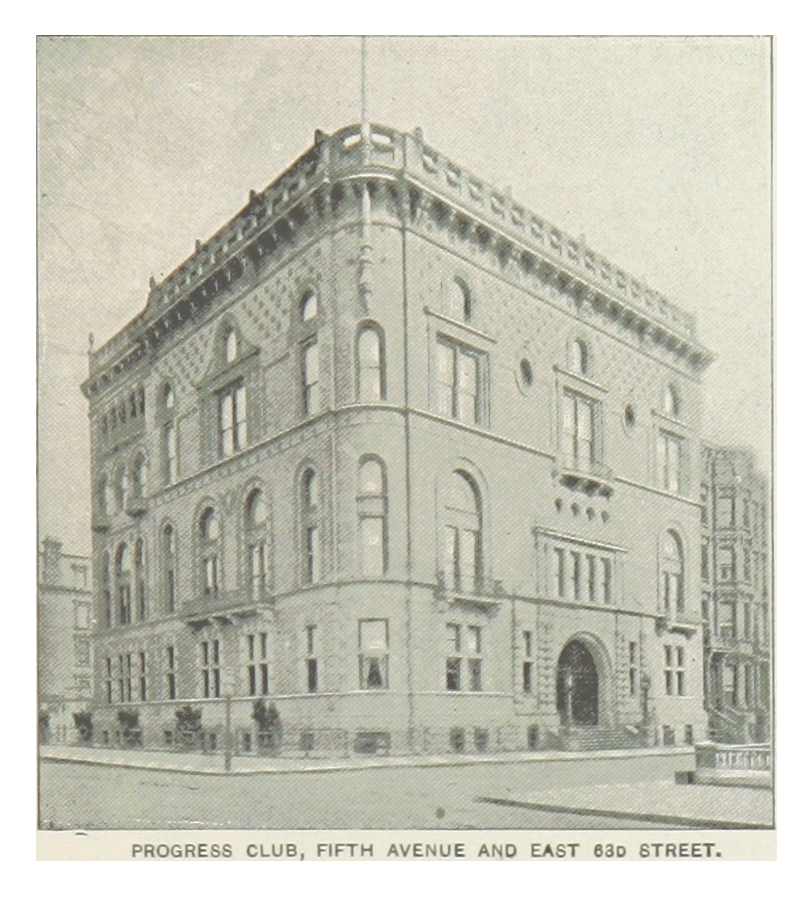
Most clubs in New York City admitted few or no Jews, or were Jewish clubs. The Progress Club, 1890–1915, was more open.

Most major cities in the United States have at least one traditional gentlemen's club, many of which have reciprocal relationships with older clubs in London, with each other, and with other gentlemen's clubs around the world. In American English, the term "gentlemen's club" is commonly used euphemistically by strip clubs. As a result, traditional gentlemen's clubs are often called "men's clubs" or "city clubs" (as opposed to country clubs), or simply "private social clubs" or "private clubs".

Christopher Doob explains in his book Social Inequality and Social Stratification in U.S. Society:

The most exclusive social clubs are in the oldest cities – Boston, New York City, and Philadelphia. Others, which are well respected, have developed in such major cities as Pittsburgh, Chicago, and San Francisco. The most exclusive social clubs are two in New York City – the Links and the Knickerbocker (Allen 1987, 25) Personal wealth has never been the sole basis for attaining membership in exclusive clubs. Individuals and families must meet the admissions committee's standards for values and behavior. Old money prevails over new money as the Rockefeller family experience suggests. John D. Rockefeller, the family founder and the nation's first billionaire, joined the Union League Club, a fairly respectable but not top-level club; John D. Rockefeller, Jr., belonged to the University Club, a step up from his father; and finally his son John D. Rockefeller, III, reached the pinnacle with his acceptance into the Knickerbocker Club (Baltzell 1989, 340).

E. Digby Baltzell, sociologist of the White Anglo-Saxon Protestant establishment, explains in his book Philadelphia Gentlemen: The Making of a National Upper Class:

The circulation of elites in America and the assimilation of new men of power and influence into the upper class takes place primarily through the medium of urban clubdom. Aristocracy of birth is replaced by an aristocracy of ballot. Frederick Lewis Allen showed how this process operated in the case of the nine "Lords of Creation" who were listed in the New York Social Register as of 1905: 'The nine men who were listed [in the Social Register] were recorded as belonging to 9.4 clubs apiece,' wrote Allen. 'Though only two of them, J. P. Morgan and Cornelius Vanderbilt III, belonged to the Knickerbocker Club, the citadel of Patrician families (indeed, both already belonged to old prominent families at the time), Stillman and Harriman joined these two in the membership of the almost equally fashionable Union Club; Baker joined these four in the membership of the Metropolitan Club of New York (Magnificent, but easier of access to new wealth); John D. Rockefeller, William Rockefeller, and Rogers, along with Morgan and Baker were listed as members of the Union League Club (the stronghold of Republican respectability); seven of the group belonged to the New York Yacht Club. Morgan belonged to nineteen clubs in all; Vanderbilt, to fifteen; Harriman, to fourteen.' Allen then goes on to show how the descendants of these financial giants were assimilated into the upper class: 'By way of footnote, it may be added that although in that year [1905] only two of our ten financiers belonged to the Knickerbocker Club, in 1933 the grandsons of six of them did. The following progress is characteristic: John D. Rockefeller, Union League Club; John D. Rockefeller, Jr., University Club; John D. Rockefeller 3rd, Knickerbocker Club. Thus is the American aristocracy recruited.'

The oldest American clubs date to the 18th century; the five oldest are the South River Club in Annapolis, Maryland (founded c. 1690/1700), the Schuylkill Fishing Company in Andalusia, Pennsylvania (1732), the Old Colony Club in Plymouth, Massachusetts (1769), the Philadelphia Club (1834), and the Union Club of the City of New York (founded 1836). The Boston Club of New Orleans, named after the card game and not the city, is the oldest southern club in the southern US, and third oldest "city club", founded in 1841. The five oldest existing clubs west of the Mississippi River are The Pacific Club in Honolulu (1851); the Pacific-Union Club (1852), Olympic Club (1860), and the Concordia-Argonaut Club (founded 1864), all in San Francisco; and the Arlington Club in Portland, Oregon (1867).

Gentlemen's clubs in the United States remain more prevalent in older cities, especially those on the East Coast. Only twelve American cities have five or more existing clubs: Atlanta, Boston, Chicago, Cincinnati, Denver, Detroit, Los Angeles, New Orleans, New York City, Philadelphia, San Francisco, Seattle, and Washington, D.C. New York City contains more than any other American city. The Yale Club of New York City, with a 22-story clubhouse and a worldwide membership of over 11,000, is the largest traditional gentlemen's club in the world. Membership in the Yale Club is restricted to alumni, faculty, and full-time graduate students of Yale University, and the club has included women among its members since 1969.

While class requirements relaxed gradually throughout the 19th and 20th centuries and, from the 1970s onward, "relics of the age of exclusion," SFGate reported in the United States in 2004, "seem to be in no danger of going the way of other 19th-century institutions."

=== Canada ===
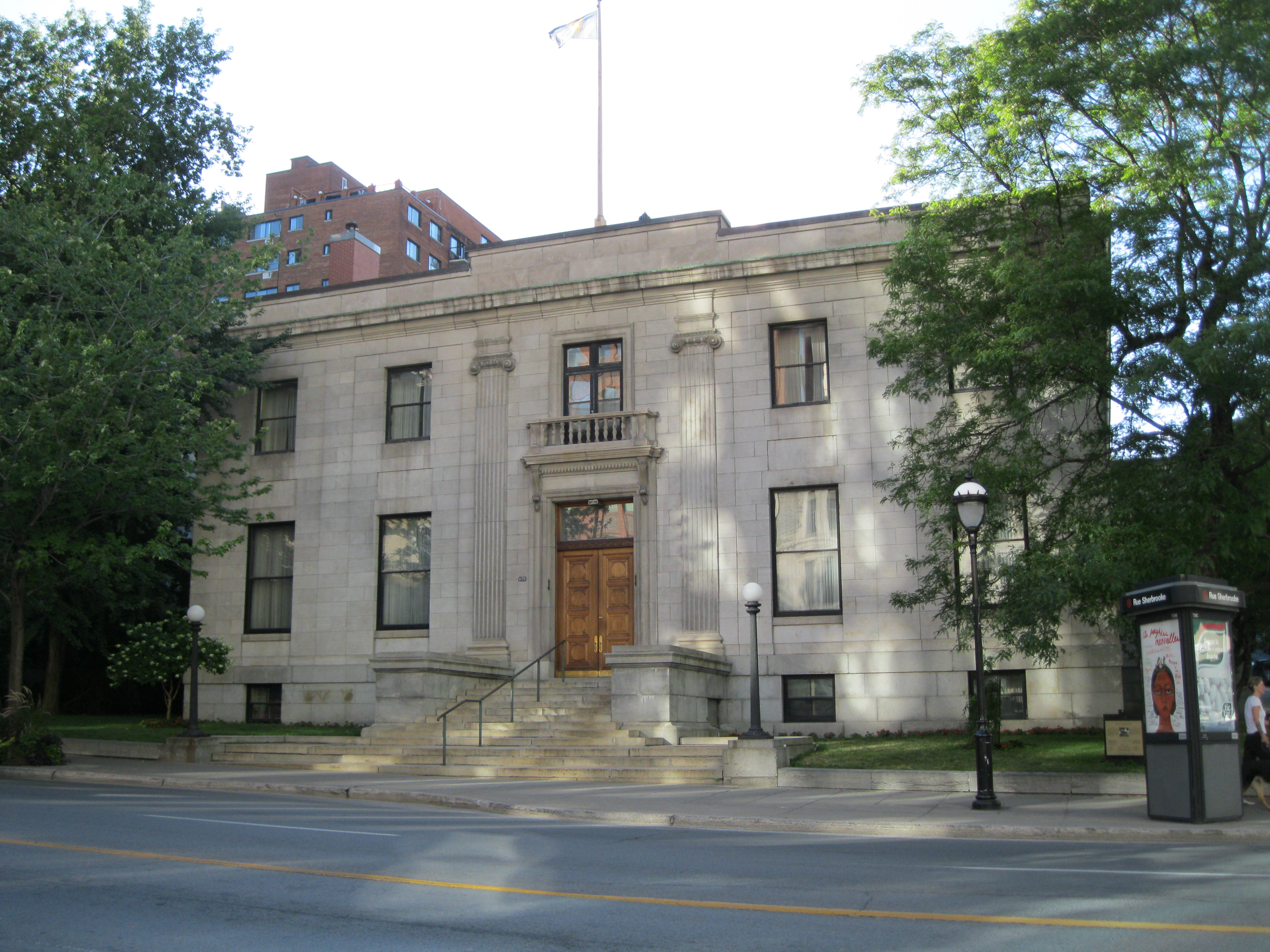
Mount Royal Club, Montreal

In Montreal, the Beaver Club was founded in 1785. Every year, some members travelled back to England to sell their furs, where they established the Canada Club in 1810; it still meets twice yearly as a dining club. The Montreal Hunt Club, founded in 1826, is the oldest extant fox hunting club in North America. The Golden Square Mile is home to several of Montreal's clubs, including Club Saint-James, which was founded in 1857. At the end of the nineteenth century, twenty of its most influential members felt that the St James was becoming 'too overcrowded' and founded the smaller Mount Royal Club in 1899. Overnight, it became the city's most prestigious club, and in 1918, Lord Birkenhead commented that it "is one of the best clubs I know in the New World, with the indefinable atmosphere about it of a good London club". In 1908 the University Club (McGill University), affiliated with McGill, opened. The Forest and Stream was formed by Frank Stephen and some of his gentlemen friends and associates on 27 November 1884 at a meeting held at the St. Lawrence Hall in Montreal. The club's original founders were Andrew Allan, James Bryce Allan, Hugh Montagu Allan, Louis Joseph Forget, Hartland St. Claire MacDougall, Hugh Paton, and Frank Stephen. It was founded with 15 shareholders and remains open.

Quebec City has the Literary and Historical Society, the Stadacona Club, and the Garrison Club, which was founded by officers of the Canadian Militia and opened to the public in 1879.

The Toronto Club is the oldest in that city, founded in 1837. Others include the National Club, the Albany Club, the York Club, the University Club of Toronto, the Faculty Club associated with the University of Toronto, the Arts and Letters Club, and a number of other clubs. Other Ontario cities have their own clubs: the Rideau Club in Ottawa; the Hamilton Club; the Frontenac Club in Kingston; and The Waterloo Club by letters patent.

The Halifax Club was founded in 1862. The Union Club (Saint John) in Saint John, New Brunswick was founded in 1884 through the merger of two earlier clubs, and the Fredericton Garrison Club was founded in 1969 by associate members of the area headquarters officers' mess.

The Manitoba Club is Western Canada's oldest club, founded in 1874 in Winnipeg. The Union Club of British Columbia was founded in 1879 in Victoria. The Vancouver Club was founded in 1889.

=== Australia ===
Australia has a number of gentlemen's clubs. Of those listed below, the Commonwealth Club, the Kelvin Club, the Newcastle Club, the Royal Automobile Club of Australia, the City Tattersalls Club in Sydney and the Union, University and Schools Club allow women to enjoy full membership.

==== New South Wales ====
Sydney has the Australian Club, the Royal Automobile Club of Australia, the Tattersalls Club and the Union, University & Schools Club. The City Tattersalls Club, which named itself after the Tattersalls Club, no longer has exclusive membership criteria.

Newcastle has the Newcastle Club.

==== Victoria ====
Melbourne has the Melbourne Club, the Alexandra Club, the Athenaeum Club (named after its counterpart in London), the Australian Club (unrelated to the identically named club in Sydney), the Kelvin Club and the Savage Club.

Geelong has The Geelong Club.

==== Queensland ====
Brisbane has the Queensland Club, the Brisbane Club, United Services Club and the Tattersalls Club (unrelated to the identically named club in Sydney).

==== South Australia ====
Adelaide has the Adelaide Club and the Naval, Military and Air Force Club of South Australia.

==== Western Australia ====
Perth has the Western Australian Club and the Weld Club.

==== Tasmania ====
Hobart has the Tasmanian Club and the Athenaeum Club. The Launceston Club is located in the northern city of Launceston

==== Australian Capital Territory ====
Canberra has the Commonwealth Club.

=== Finland ===
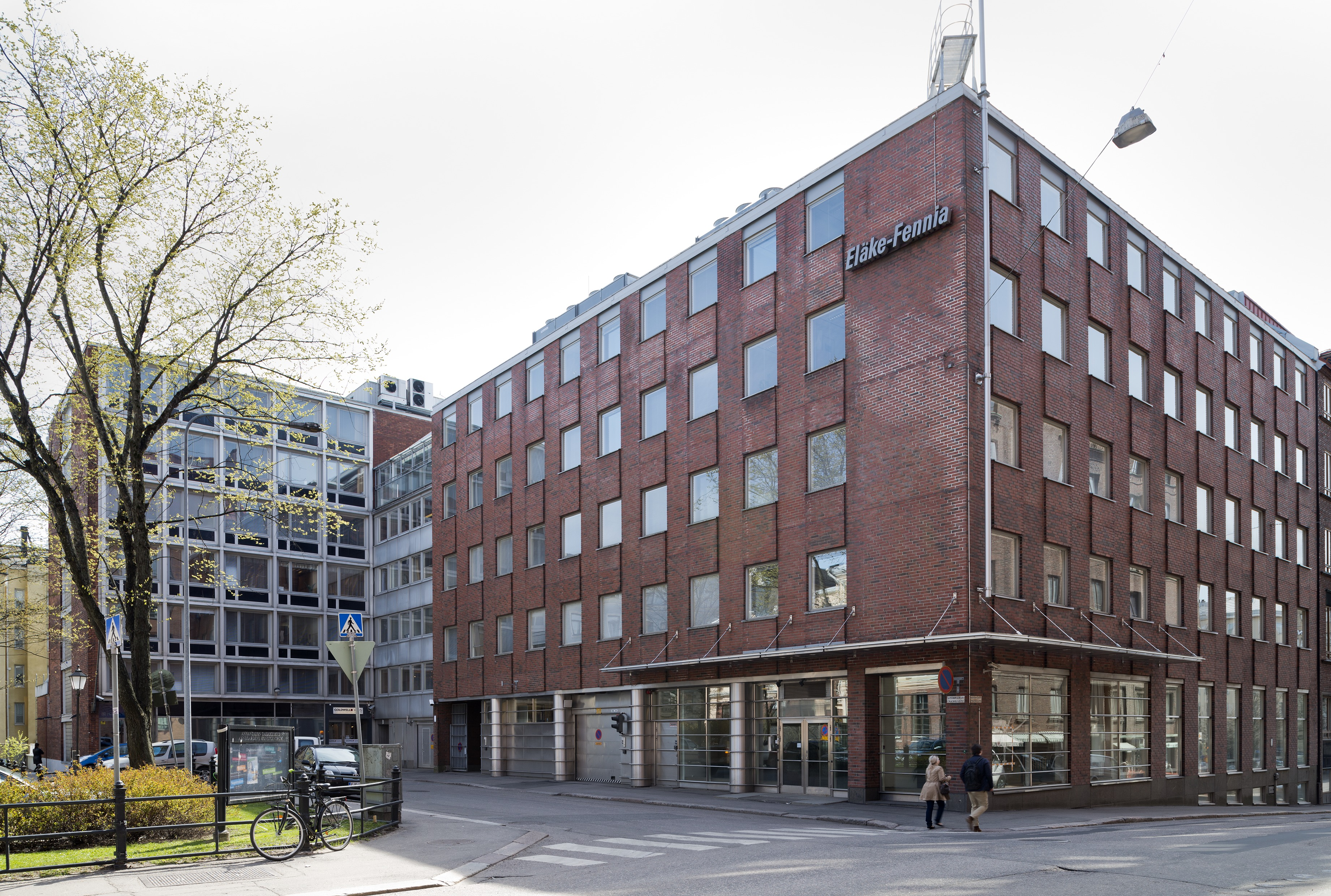
Helsinki Finnish Club

Helsinki Finnish Club at Kansakoulukuja in Kamppi, Helsinki is a notable gentlemen's club in Finland. It was founded on 25 April 1876 in Helsinki, dedicated to preserving Finnish culture, national traditions, and the Finnish language. There are also other Finnish Clubs in other Finnish cities such as Tampere, Pori, and Oulu. The Vyborg Finnish Club was established in 1888, but after World War II, Finland lost Vyborg to the Soviet Union; the Vyborg Finnish Club is currently located in Helsinki. Another club worth mentioning, originally from Vyborg, is the Pamaus Society, which is now also active at the Karelia House in Helsinki.

The Helsinki Bourse Club, founded in 1910, was originally a Swedish-speaking club but is now a bilingual, majority Finnish-language club that also admits women.

Clubs devoted to preserving the traditions and heritage of Swedish-speaking Finns include Svenska Klubben i Helsingfors (the Swedish Club in Helsinki), founded in 1880, and Svenska Klubben i Åbo (the Swedish Club in Turku), founded in 1889.

=== France ===
The English Club of Pau, France, chartered by an Anglo-American winter colony in 1856, is now named the le Cercle anglais.

=== Hong Kong, China ===
As a former British colony, gentlemen's clubs became established in Hong Kong and continued to operate after the transfer of sovereignty to China in 1997. The Hong Kong Club, which opened in 1846, was the first gentlemen's club in the city. Other gentlemen’s clubs in Hong Kong include Club Lusitano (1866), the Chinese Club (1897), the American Club Hong Kong (1925), the Hongkong Japanese Club (1955) and the China Club (1991). Ladies-only examples include Ladies' Recreation Club (1883) and The Helena May (1916).

In Hong Kong, many recreational and sports clubs have roles comparable to those of gentlemen’s clubs, or have similar origins. Examples include the Royal Hong Kong Yacht Club (1849), Hong Kong Cricket Club (1851), Hong Kong Jockey Club (1884), Hong Kong Football Club (1886), Hong Kong Golf Club (1889), Craigengower Cricket Club (1894), Kowloon Cricket Club (1904), Chinese Recreation Club (1910), Shek O Country Club (1919), and Hong Kong Country Club (1962), among others.

Many of these clubs host major sporting events that attract Chinese and international participants and spectators, including the BMW Hong Kong Derby, the Longines Hong Kong International Races, the Rolex China Sea Race, the Standard Chartered HKFC Soccer Sevens, Link Hong Kong Open and HSBC LIV Golf Hong Kong.

In addition to sporting and social activities, some clubs are also involved in charitable work, including through the American Club Foundation, the LRC Charitable Foundation, the FCC Charity, The Hong Kong Jockey Club Charities Trust, RHKYC Charity Foundation, The Clearwater Bay Golf & Country Club Charitable Foundation and The Hong Kong Club Foundation.

Most of the gentlemen's clubs are located on Hong Kong Island, home to the city's long-established central business district. A smaller number are found in Kowloon and the New Territories. On Hong Kong Island, the clubs are concentrated in Central, Causeway Bay, and the Southern District. In Kowloon, most are located in Jordan and King's Park.

=== Japan ===
In 1884, the Tokyo Club was founded in line with the principles of the Meiji era as a British-style gentlemen's club; the original membership included leading Japanese politicians, functionaries, and men of finance, as well as foreign ambassadors and representatives. Originally located in the Rokumeikan, the club moved to a dedicated clubhouse built in 1897 in Shinbashi and was replaced in 1912 by a newer clubhouse in Kasumigaseki. Since 2005, it has been situated in Roppongi; its Patron is Masahito, Prince Hitachi.

Like the Tokyo Club, the Kasumi Kaikan was previously located in the Rokumeikan, and continues on its own modern premises as a club of the former kazoku nobility with strict membership rules. Although it possesses many characteristics of a gentlemen's club, membership is open to women.

=== Bangladesh ===
- Dhaka Club
- Chittagong Club
- Narayanganj Club Ltd
- Gulshan Club

=== Pakistan ===
Numerous gentlemen's clubs were established in modern-day Pakistan before Indian independence and partition. These clubs included the Peshawar Club founded in 1863; Punjab Club Lahore in 1863; Sind Club founded in Karachi in 1871; Lahore Gymkhana founded in 1878; Karachi Gymkhana founded in 1886; Quetta Club founded in 1891; the Karachi Club founded in the same city in 1907; Chenab Club Faisalabad founded in 1910. At one point, Karachi was also home to the Hindu Gymkhana, which was established for the merchant class in the city.

Gentlemen's clubs in Pakistan during the colonial era restricted membership to Europeans; the Sind Club once hung a sign outside the door stating, "Dogs and Locals not allowed." Most pre-partition clubs in Pakistan have abandoned exclusivity and now offer membership for a fee. These include Karachi Club and Karachi Yacht Club. However, some have retained exclusivity, with membership available by invitation or referral. These include Lahore Gymkhana, Punjab Club, Karachi Gymkhana, Islamabad Club, Sind Club, Chenab Club Faisalabad, Quetta Club, Peshawar Club, Karachi Boat Club, and Karachi Golf Club.

=== South Africa ===
South Africa is home to the Rand Club in downtown Johannesburg, the Wanderers Club in Illovo, Johannesburg, the Inanda Club in Sandton, and the Johannesburg Country Club. In Cape Town, there are the spacious Kelvin Grove Club, the Cape Town Club, and the Owl Club. Durban has the Durban Club, founded in 1852, and Kimberley has the Kimberley Club, founded in 1881.

=== South America ===
Lima, Peru has several traditional gentlemen's clubs still functioning, such as the Club Nacional, the Phoenix Club (Peru), and the Club de la Banca y Comercio.

Buenos Aires, Argentina is home to the Club del Progreso (founded 1852; the oldest gentlemen's club in South America), the Jockey Club, and the Club Universitario de Buenos Aires. The Club 20 de Febrero was founded in 1858 by General Rudecindo Alvarado in Salta. The club's name honors the Battle of Salta on 20 February 1813, during the Argentine War of Independence.

Santiago, Chile, is home to the Club de la Unión, originally a club exclusively for rich men. Viña del Mar has the Club de Viña del Mar.

=== Spain ===
Clubs in Spain (called Casinos or Círculos culturales in Spanish) emerged at the beginning of the 19th century, during the political transition between the old regime and the constitutional liberalism. They were open only to members, initially the bourgeoisie and the upper classes. By 1882, there were 1,552 casinos in Spain, according to the Ministry of the Interior. Modern casinos culturales promote civic, cultural, artistic, and recreational activities. Some cities have more than one club due to their origins. For example, in Seville there are three clubs: one that originally restricted admission to businessmen and industrialists, another to landowners, and another to renowned scientists, writers, and artists. The Spanish Federation of Gentlemen's clubs (Federación Española de Círculos y Casinos Culturales), founded in 1928, coordinates and defends the interests of the most important clubs in Spain.

=== Sweden ===
Clubs in Sweden include Sällskapet ('The Society'), founded in 1800; the military club Militärsällskapet; Nya Sällskapet ('The New Society') in Stockholm; and the Royal Bachelors' Club in Gothenburg.

=== New Zealand ===
List of private gentlemen's clubs in New Zealand:

Image	Name	Est.	Location	Ref.
	Blenheim Club	1903	Blenheim	https://www.blenheimclub.co.nz/
	Canterbury Club	1872	Christchurch	https://www.canterburyclub.co.nz/
	Christchurch Club	1856	Christchurch	https://www.christchurchclub.co.nz/
	Dunedin Club	1858	Dunedin	https://www.dunedinclub.co.nz/
	Hawkes Bay Club	1863	Napier	https://hbclub.nz/
	Invercargill Club	1879	Invercargill	https://www.invercargillclub.co.nz/
	Masterton Club	1877	Masterton	https://mastertonclub.co.nz/
	Nelson Club	1874	Nelson	https://nelsonclub.nz/
	Northern Club	1869	Auckland	https://northernclub.co.nz/
	South Canterbury Club	1890	Timaru	https://www.scclub.co.nz/
	Wellington Club	1841	Wellington	https://www.wellingtonclub.co.nz/

=== Thailand ===
The most prestigious active gentlemen's club in Thailand is the Royal Bangkok Sports Club, one of Thailand's oldest sporting institutions, with construction personally funded by King Rama V.

=== Singapore ===
The Tanglin Club, founded in 1865, is a Singaporean club.

== Membership ==
Membership in a club requires both the means to do so and meeting the criteria a club maintains.

Entry fees, dues, dining and bar tabs, meeting dress codes, and compliance with other rules or conventions all contribute to the cost of club membership. Most clubs have favourable subscription fees for younger members.

All clubs have requirements for entry. These may include required sponsors, specific financial requirements, shared backgrounds (such as collegiate affiliations), or any stipulations a club may set by law.

Examples of clubs based on university affiliation are the Yale Club and Penn Club, which are open to all who have a connection with their respective universities.

The Caledonian Club in London requires "being of direct Scottish descent" or "having, in the opinion of the Committee, the closest association with Scotland."

Membership in the Travellers Club has been restricted since its foundation in 1819 by Rule 6 of its constitution, which mandates that "no person be considered eligible to the Travellers' Club, who shall not have travelled out of the British islands to a distance of at least 500 miles from London in a direct line".

The Reform Club requires its potential members to attest that they would have supported the 1832 Reform Act, whilst certain members of the East India Club must have attended one of its affiliated public schools.

== See also ==
- Fraternity
- Fraternal order
- Social club
- Country club
- Dining club
- List of India's gentlemen's clubs
- List of London's gentlemen's clubs
- List of American gentlemen's clubs
- Membership discrimination in California clubs
- Woman's club movement in the United States
