= Jashore Institute =

Club & Institute in Jashore, Bangladesh

- যশোর ইনস্টিটিউট
- Formation: 1851; 175 years ago as Jessore Public Library . 1909; 117 years ago as Jessore Town Club. 1928; 98 years ago as Jashore Institute
- Founder: Rai Bahadur Jadunath Majumdar
- Merger of: Town Club, New Ariyan Theater (1928)
- Type: Social, Culture, sports and recreation
- Legal status: Institute & Club
- Headquarters: Daratana, Jashore, Bangladesh
- Location: Town hall Ground, 4, Mujib Sarak, Daratana, Jashore - 7450, Bangladesh
- Members: 3,465
- Official language: Bengali, English
- President: MD. Azharul Haque
- Secretary General: Dr. MD. Abdul Kalam Azad Litu
- Main organ: Coummitee
- Subsidiaries: Jessore Institute Public Library. Town Club. New Ariyan Theater.
- Website: https://jashoreinstitute.org.bd/
- Formerly called: Jashore Town Club

The Jashore Institute (formerly spelled as Jessore Institute) is the oldest recreation organisation and the largest of elite clubs in Jashore.

== History ==
Jashore Institute is one of the oldest and best traditional educational, cultural and sports institutions in Bangladesh, which has reached the threshold of a century at the private level. However, according to Article 56 of the Constitution, Jessore Institute is inevitably a public development organization. Where Mangalgeet is sung for the spiritual development of book lovers, sports and culture lovers. With the generosity of the landlords and influential people of that time, with the enthusiasm of the library fans, theater lovers and sports enthusiasts of Jessore, in 1928, Rai Bahadur Jadunath Majumdar took the initiative to establish Jessore Institute by bringing together the Public Library, New Ariyan Theater and Town Club. He was the first general secretary of Jessore Institute. At that time, he was the landlord of Narail. A prominent lawyer of Jashore, Chairman of Jashore Municipality and nominated president of Jashore District Council. A liberal personality with modern education. jashore Institute was established on his own land.

Rai Bahadur Jadunath, a polyglot, journalist, teacher, religious scholar and lawyer, was born in 1927 in the Majumdar family of Lohagarh in Jashore district. Majumdar took the initiative to create a complete cultural center by combining the Public Library, New Arya Theater and Town Club. As a result of this initiative, Jashore Institute was established in 1928. The institution has given birth to many public welfare and service institutions after many ups and downs. In addition to the Public Library, Town Hall or Alamgir Siddiqui Hall, Town Club, Munshi Meherullah Maidan (former Town Hall Maidan), Swadhinata Manch or Open Manch, Rawshan Ali Sanskriti Manch, New Arya Theater or Institute Natya Kala Sangsad, B Sarkar Memorial Hall, Tasbir Mahal, Bishwanath Library Hall, Book Bank or Regional Central Book Bank Building. Chitta Binodan Kendra CRC Shishu Institute Primary School is one of them.

Although Jessore Institute was established in 1928, the Town Hall was established in 1909, the Town Club and the New Arya Theatre were established in 1919. The B. Sarkar Memorial Hall Mahal was built in 1921 for the New Arya Theatre. At present, there are three departments in Jashore Institute in addition to the main organization. For example, Jashore Institute Public Library, Jaahore Institute Sports Department and Jashore Institute Dramatic Arts Council. The Town Club and the Children's Recreation Center or CRC Department are associated with the Sports Department. Jessore Institute Government Primary School Due to the governmentization, Jessore Institute no longer has the administrative power of Jessore Institute. However, Jessore Institute is known and popular as a government primary school. It is known from the documents of Jessore Institute that the institute's elections were held every year in the beginning. Due to the Second World War, in 1943, it served as a committee without any elections. Elections were held again from 1944. But from 1948 to 1953, this institution ran with a nominated committee.

At present, the institute elections are held every three years. The donors and general members elect 20 public representatives by voting. These elected executives elect three vice-presidents of the institute, one general secretary, two assistant general secretaries, one library secretary, one sports secretary, one town club secretary, one drama secretary and one children's entertainment secretary. At present, Jessore Institute Primary School runs according to government policies. The District Commissioner is the president of Jessore Institute by virtue of his office. Sub-committees are formed in different departments and these sub-committees are responsible for managing the respective departments. Every year, the activities of the institute including each department and the audited accounts are reviewed in the annual general meeting. In the early days of its establishment, mainly Englishmen and scoundrels got the opportunity to use the institute and the library. After about half a century, the educated Hindu community gained the upper hand. Before the acquisition of Pakistan, Muslims had little opportunity to use this institution. The Jessore Institute has 3,870 members, including 71 contributing members, 749 life members, 271 library department members, 140 sports department members, 75 in the theater department, and 13 in the subscription-free children's department.

== Principal Organs ==
There are three Principal organs of this Institute.

They are :

1. Jashore Institute Public Library.
2. Town Club.
3. Ariyan Theater.

=== Jashore Institute Public Library ===
Main article: Jashore Institute Public Library.

The Jashore Institute of Public Library is one of the principal organ of this Institute Since 1928. Although it was first independent public library in Bangladesh dates back to 1851. When the Town Club and new Ariyan Theater marge together then the library also marge with it. And become a principal organ of it.

=== Town Club ===
The town Club is one of the principal organ of this Institute. It was established in 1909. And it handles the sport, arts and recreative programs of this Institute.

=== Ariyan Theater ===
The New Ariyan Theater was established in 1919. In 1928 it marge with town club make the Jashore Institute. Today the Ariyan Theater is one of the three Principal organs of that institute which handles the cultural programs of this Institute.

== See also ==
- Dhaka Club
- Chittagong Club
- Narayanganj Club Limited
- Calcutta Club
- The Bengal Club
