= Jashore Institute Public Library =

Research institute in Bangladesh

Coordinates: 23.1642°N 89.2093°E

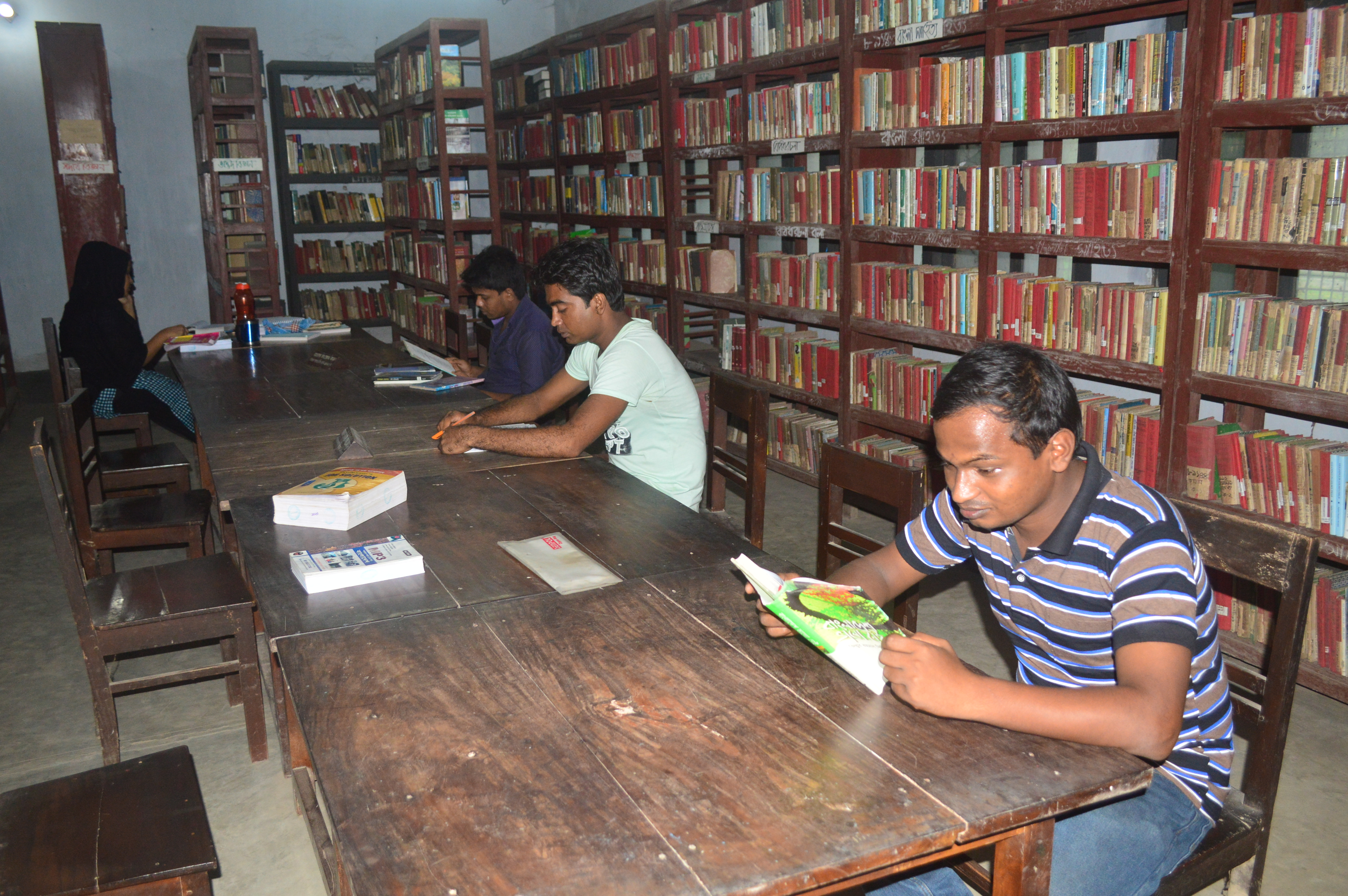
- Jashore Institute Public Library in 2016
- Formation: 1851; 175 years ago
- Type: Government
- Legal status: Institute
- Headquarters: Jashore, Bangladesh
- Region served: Bangladesh
- Official language: Bengali
- Parent organization: Jashore Institute
- Formerly called: Jessore Public library (1851-1951); Jessore Institute Public Library (1951-2018)

Jashore Institute Public Library (Bengali: যশোর ইনস্টিটিউট পাবলিক লাইব্রেরি) is a public library in Jashore city founded in 1851. It is the oldest library in Bangladesh and one of the oldest libraries in South Asia.

== History ==
Jashore Public Library was founded in 1851 by R. C. Rex. the district tax collector, in a central location of Jashore city. R. C. Rex received funding from the local elites such as the indigo planters and local zamindars of Narail and Naldanga. The library became a centre of social and literary gathering in Jashore. The library had a billiard room. Jashore city developed around the library, the Jashore Town hall was built in 1904 and Aryan Theatre in 1919. Roy Bahadur Jadunath Majumdar combined the public library with Aryan Theatre and the Town Club in 1927 to form a combined cultural and community centre for Jashore. This created the Jashore Institute which was renamed by the government to Jashore Institute Public Library.

In 1928, the library moved to a new building which was financed by Abinashchandra Sarker, a lawyer, The library hall was named Biswanath Hall after the father of Abinashchandra Sarker. In 1942 the library compound was taken over by the Royal Indian Air Force as part of preparations for World War II. The library started functioning again as a library after the end of World War II. The library needed renovation following its use as a military base and the partition of India. In 1953 funds were provided by the United Front government of East Pakistan.

In 1960, a professional librarian was hired, a modern cataloguing system was implemented, and the open shelf model was adopted. The library moved in 1964 into a new two storied building of about 11,000 square feet (1,000 m^{2}).

In 1978 the Khulna Divisional Development Board build a new Book Bank Hall for the library. The library has 67,197 books. The library had 49,306 Bengali books and 17,391 books in English language. The rest of the books are in Arabic, Persian language, and Urdu. The library has ancient manuscripts written in palm leaves including Shrikrishna Daipayana, the writer of the Hindu epic Mahabharata.
