= Dhaka Club =

Club in Dhaka, Bangladesh

Coordinates: 23°44′19.13″N 90°23′49.65″E

Dhaka Club Limited
- Logo of Dhaka Club
- Formation: August 19, 1911; 115 years ago
- Type: Social club, sports and recreation
- Headquarters: Shahbag, Dhaka, Bangladesh
- Location: 1, Maulana Abdul Hamid Khan Bhashani Road
- Members: 4500
- Official language: English
- President: Altamash Kabir
- Website: dhakaclubltd.com

The Dhaka Club Limited (formerly spelled as Dacca Club) is the oldest recreation organisation and the largest of elite clubs in Dhaka. Originally it was an all-white association in British India.

== Description ==
Dhaka club has been described as "an oasis of calm in a frantic city, a colonial relic with several acres of lawns, tennis courts, reading rooms." It has been noted that "the real old-school Dhaka wealth and political power calls this recreation club home. In times of ferment the city is ruled by Dhaka University; in times of peace the city is controlled by Dhaka Club."

The club is located near Shahbag Intersection. It is surrounded by Dhaka University, Bangladesh National Museum, Hotel Sheraton, BIRDEM Hospital, Ramna Park and the Suhrawardy Udyan.

The club has facilities for meetings and seminars, as well as hall rooms, guest-rooms, kitchens and dining rooms, playing courts and rooms for table tennis, billiards, cards, squash, and lawn tennis, and a swimming pool. The wood-paneled club house is one of the few surviving British Raj era buildings in Dhaka. The Dhaka Club has three clay tennis courts and two squash courts. In former times, indoor and outdoor games were dominant features of the club. At present, it gives considerable attention to cultural activities.

== History ==
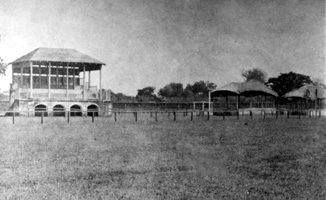
Pavilion of Ramna Racecourse in early 20th century, owned and managed together with Gymkhana Club

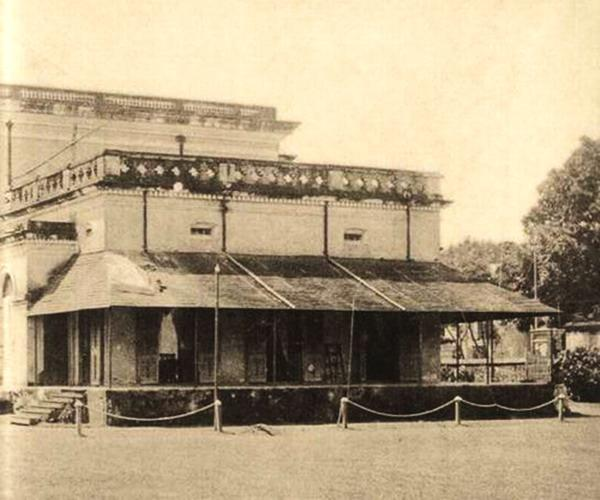
The old club house in 1890

The origins of the club date back to 1825, when European residents in Old Dhaka established a gentleman's club in Victoria Park (now known as Bahadur Shah Park) by that name. It was established in place of an older club known as the Armenian Club or the Antagar (a corruption of Addagar or Gossip House). The last name rendered its name to the park, which came to be known as Antagar Maidan (Antaghor Field). In 1851, the club premise shifted to Ramna with help from local aristocrats along with Europeans. The land of Dhaka Club was leased out from the Dhaka Nawab Family from their Shahbag garden estate.

After the partition of Bengal in 1905, Dhaka was made the capital of the new province of Eastern Bengal and Assam. The British civilians, who came to govern the new province, felt the need of a social club. The club was fashioned after the model of the Bengal Club of Kolkata. It was registered on 19 August 1911 and was granted legal status on 14 September 1911 under the Indian Companies Act of 1882. The founding members were Lt. Col. EA Hall (Civil Surgeon, Dhaka), CR Bryan, HG Bally (Commandant, Military Police Battalion, Dhaka), JO Rennie (PWD, Dhaka), and JS Wilson and AT Halliday of Indian Police, Dhaka.

"The British reunited Bengal in 1911 and compensated Dhaka with the Dhaka University and the Dhaka Club." The membership of the club grew quickly in the 1920s and '30s as many Europeans came to Dhaka in connection with the jute trade, steam navigation, the railway and estate management. Many of the members were high-ranking British officers from Minto Road. Native population, including local elites, were not allowed, while Anglo-Indians had full access.

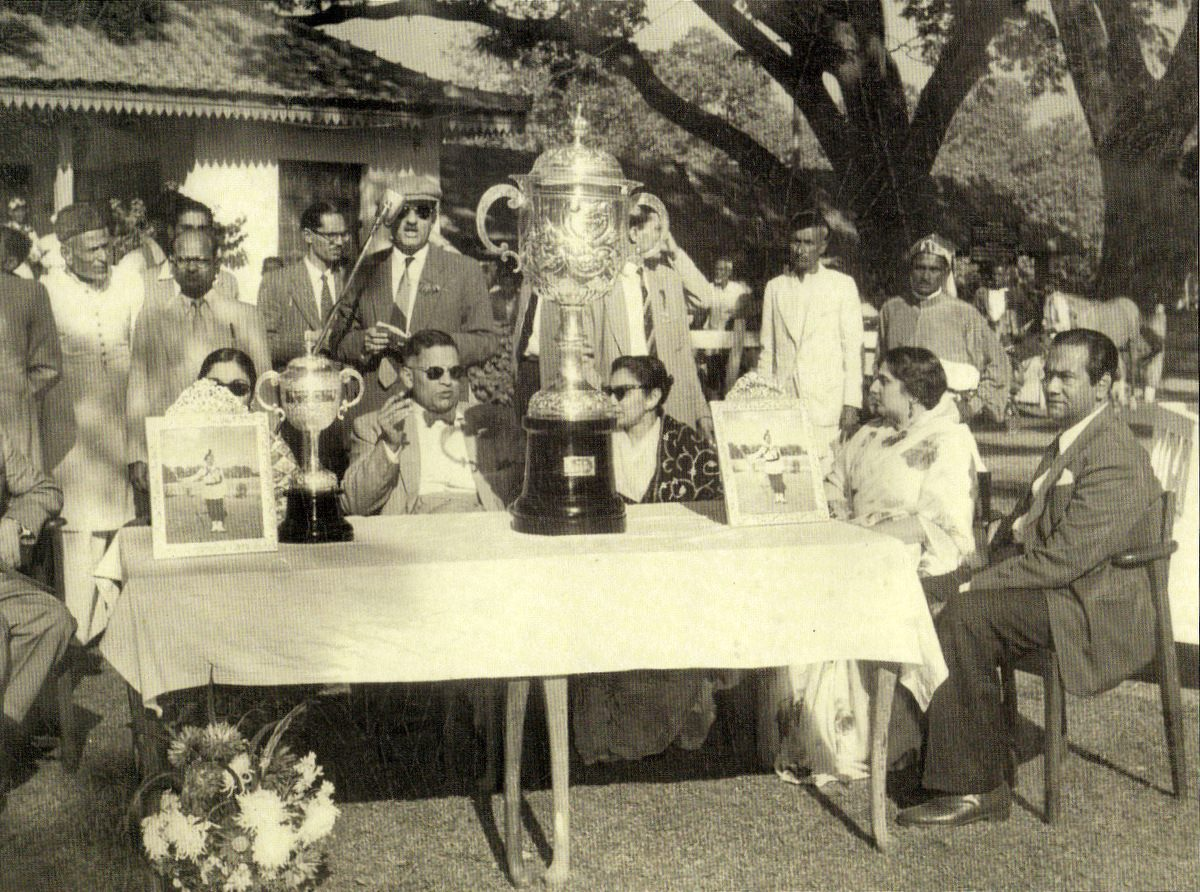
Major General Umrao Khan and Justice Syed Mahbub Murshed handing out trophies to winners of a horse race at the Club's racecourse.

In 1941, the Governor of Bengal leased out a tract of land comprising 524 bighas (173 acres) to the Dhaka Club. The club used the land to develop a racecourse (known as ramna racecourse, now converted into Ramna Garden), a golf course, the club buildings and playgrounds. The golf course is one of the oldest golf courses in South Asia, and was owned and managed by Dhaka Club and nearby Gymkhana Club together. Gymkhana Club, located at the opposing side of Shahbag gardens, also patronized the Racecourse together with Dhaka Club. During Bangladesh Liberation War the club was closed except for a few staff. On 26 March 1971 Pakistani army tried to enter the club but Madhuraj, the Nepali security guard, refused entry. He along with few other staff were executed by Pakistan army after they forcefully entered the club. After the Independence of Bangladesh, the club adapted more Bengali characteristics. In 1973 it changed the Letter head of the club to Bangla. In 1978 Geetiara Safya Chowdhury became the first female member of the club. In the 21st century the club arrived with only about 5 acres (20,000 m2) of land left in its control, as the rest has been overtaken by the government of Bangladesh by acquisition.

== Rules ==
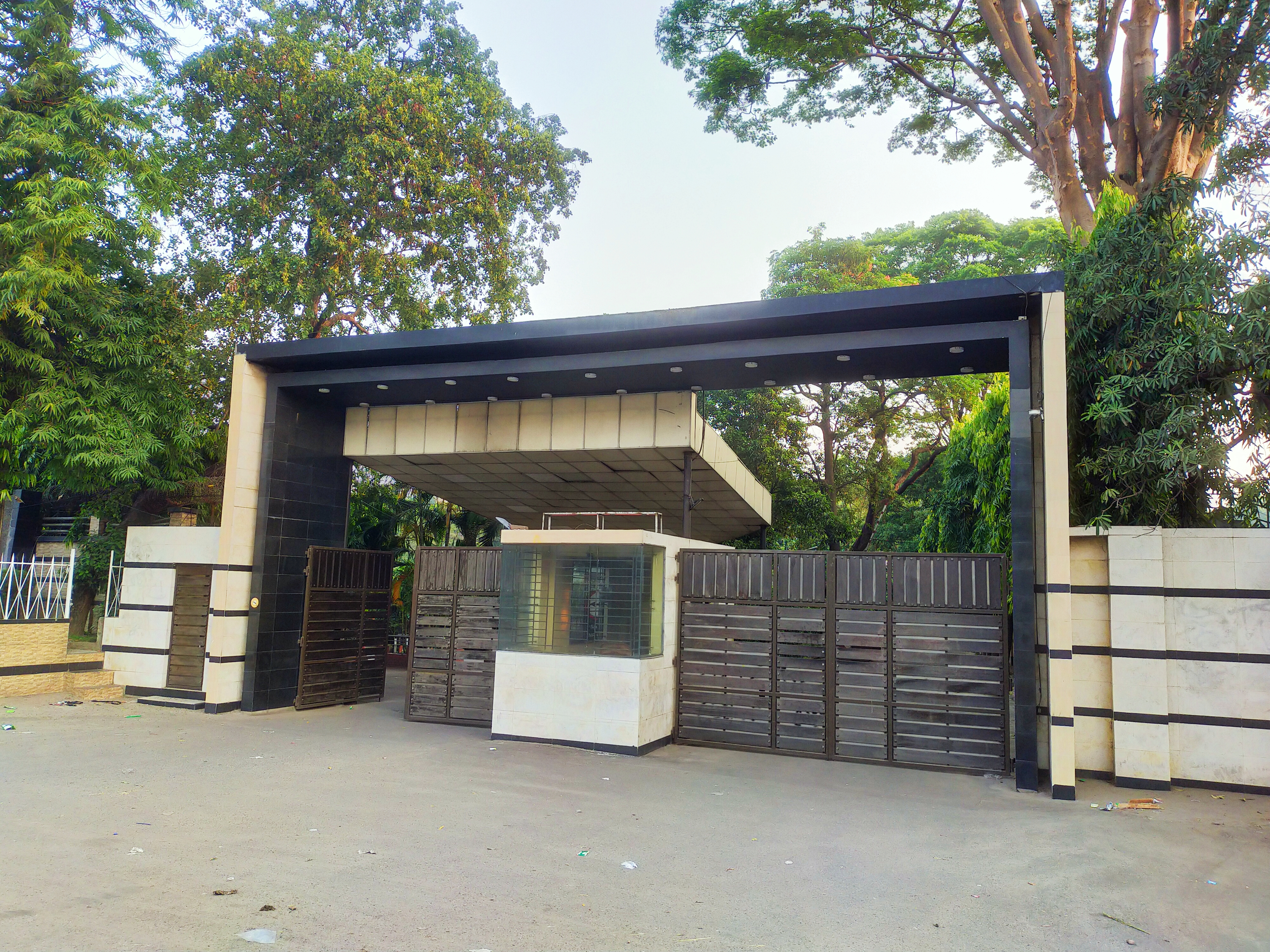
Main Gate of Dhaka Club now (2025)

The club is run by an executive committee comprising a president and 10 members who are elected for a one-year term in a general meeting. The right to vote is limited to 1,500 permanent and life members as well as general members. who form a highly privileged company. That total figure of 1,500 is strictly protected, though any member can resign and nominate his successor. A past president was forced to resign because he "accidentally" allowed this limit to be exceeded that number. Foreigners can become members for an annual fee. However, members are of different categories such as life members, general members, honorary members, special members, and officers of the defense forces. The total number of members of the club in 2016 was 3,120, a figure that is considered as the highest membership limit.

The rules and regulations of the remain the same from the times of the Raj. No locals are permitted in the lounge, the bar, the dining room or the card room. The only concession that the Dhaka Club has made is to permit the loose kurta inside its premises. For men the dress rule is collared shirt and covered shoes.

== See also ==
- Chittagong Club
- Narayanganj Club Limited
- Jashore Institute
- The Bengal Club
- Calcutta Club
