= Goshpi Avari =

Pakistani sailor

Goshpi Avari is a Pakistani Asian Games gold medalist in sailing. She won the medal with her husband, Byram, at the 1982 Games. She was the first and, until 2010, the only Pakistani woman to have won a gold medal at a major international competition.

== Family ==
Goshpi Avari and Byram have three children together, including Xerxes, also an Asian Games competitor for Pakistan. Xerxes Avari was named in the Pakistan sailing squad for the 2006 Asian Games in the International 470 class and also competed in the 2010 Asian Games.

== Sailing ==
Avari won a gold medal in enterprise class yachting at the 1982 Asian Games in New Delhi, India, where she was the only female competitor in the sport.

== Awards ==
Ribbon	Decoration	Country	Year
	Pride of Performance	Pakistan	2011

The Pride of Performance was conferred upon Goshpi Avari by the President of Pakistan in recognition of her achievements in sailing. She was selected for the award in August 2010 and officially received the honor at a ceremony at the Governor's House in Karachi on 23 March 2011.

== See also ==
- Avari Hotels
- List of Parsis
