= Byram D. Avari =

Pakistani businessman and sailor (1942–2023)

- Born: 1942; British India
- Died: 22 January 2023 (aged 81)
- Occupations: Businessman, athlete
- Organization: Avari Group
- Known for: Commodore of Karachi Yacht Club in 1976 and 1980; Double Asian Games Gold Medalist
- Spouse: Goshpi Avari
- Children: 2 sons, 1 daughter
- Awards: Pride of Performance Award for Sports (Sailing) in 1982

Byram Dinshawji Avari (Urdu: بیرام ڈی آواری; 1942 – 22 January 2023) was a Pakistani hotelier and double Asian Games gold medalist in Sailing. He was based in Karachi, Sindh and owner of Avari Hotels.

== Family and Personal life ==
Byram Dinshawji Avari was a member of the Parsi community. Byram and Goshpi Avari have three children together, including Xerxes, also an Asian Games competitor for Pakistan. Xerxes Avari was named in the Pakistan sailing squad for the 2006 Asian Games in the International 470 class and also competed in the 2010 Asian Games.

Avari died on 22 January 2023, at the age of 81.

== Business concerns ==
Together with his sons, he owned and operated the Avari Group of companies, of which he was the chairman.

Hotel management is the Avari Group's core business. In Pakistan, the group owns and operates Avari Hotels which include 5-star deluxe hotels in Karachi, Lahore, Sargodha, Gujranwala, Faisalabad and Gilgit, the 5-star Avari Towers and the seafront Beach Luxury Hotel in Karachi. The group is also actively pursuing opportunities for owning and/or managing 3 and 4-star properties elsewhere in Pakistan.

The Avari Group is the first Pakistani company to have obtained international hotel management contracts: they operated the 200-room 4-star hotel in Dubai in the United Arab Emirates and previously managed the 200-room Ramada Inn in Toronto at Pearson Airport in Canada.

== Honorary consul ==
Avari was the honorary consul, or a diplomatic representative, for Canada.

== Sailing ==
Avari was the commodore of Karachi Yacht Club in 1976 and again in 1980. He was a gold medallist in 'enterprise class' yachting at the 1978 Asian Games in Bangkok with Munir Sadiq and again at the 1982 Asian Games in New Delhi with his wife, Goshpi. He also won a silver medal at the Enterprise World Championship held in Canada in 1978.

== Parsi community ==
Avari was chairman of the Karachi Parsi Anjuman.

== Awards and recognition ==
Ribbon	Decoration	Country	Year
	Pride of Performance	Pakistan	1982

Pride of Performance Award for Sports (Sailing) in 1982 by the President of Pakistan.

== See also ==
- Avari Hotels
- List of Parsis
