= Weld Club =

Private social club in Perth, Western Australia

- Named after: Frederick Weld
- Formation: 8 August 1871
- Type: Male-only social club
- Headquarters: Barrack Street, Perth, Australia
- Members: 842 (2021)
- Official language: English
- Website: www.weld.club Building details
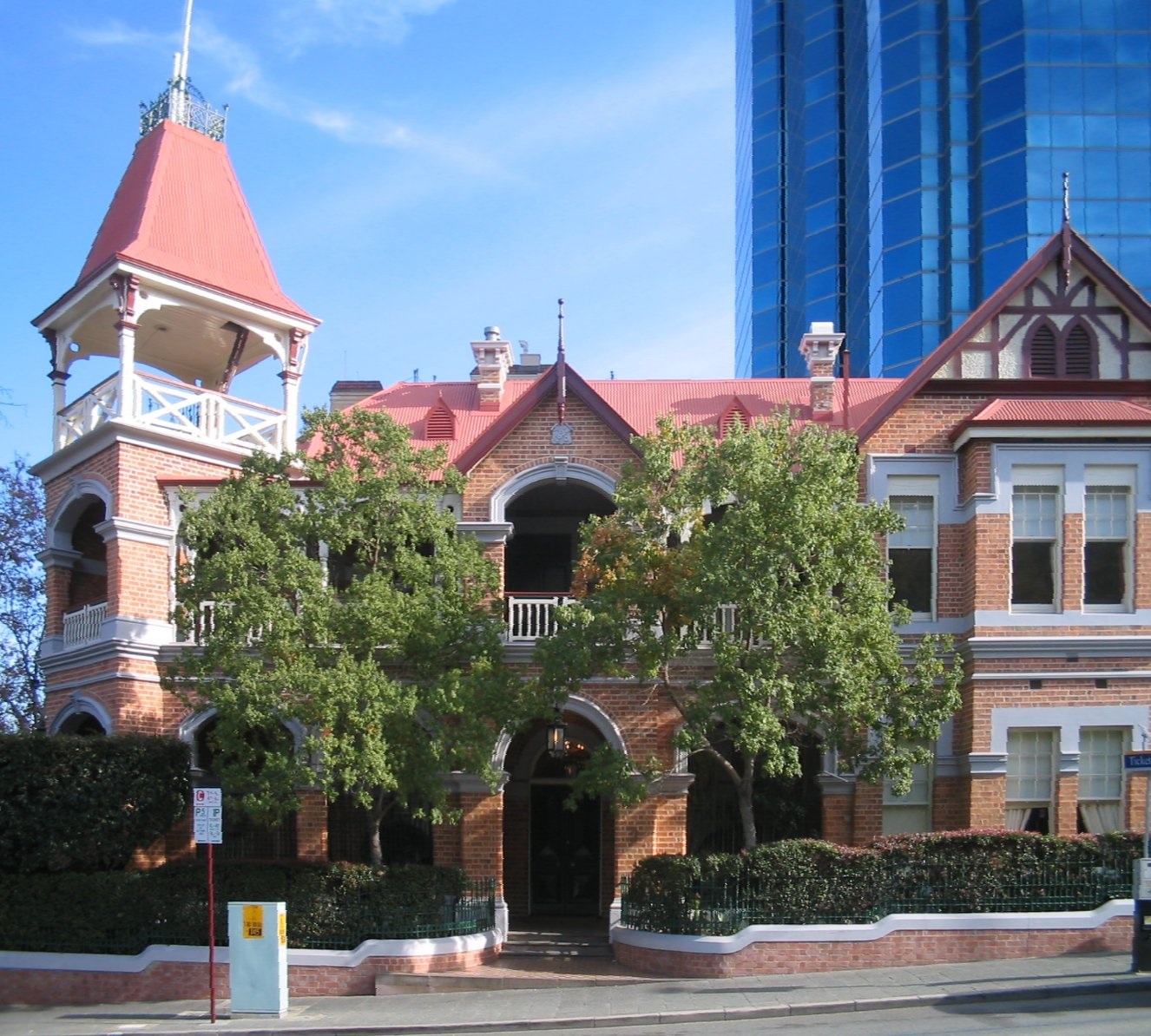
- Weld Club building as viewed from the eastern side of Barrack Street

General information
- Type: Heritage-listed building
- Location: 3 Barrack Street, Perth, Western Australia
- Coordinates: 31°57′24″S 115°51′33″E
- Construction started: 1891; 135 years ago
- Completed: 22 December 1892; 133 years ago

Western Australia Heritage Register
- Type: State Registered Place
- Designated: 17 April 2003
- Reference no.: 1950

The Weld Club is a private male-only social club in Perth, Western Australia. Founded in 1871 as a gentlemen's club, it is named after Frederick Weld, the chronologically first patron of the club and the Governor of Western Australia at the time.

== Building ==
As of May 2022, the club occupies a building designed by Talbot Hobbs and constructed in 1892 by the Bunning Brothers, the founders of Bunnings, for the organisation. It is situated at the corner of The Esplanade and Barrack Street, immediately across the street from Stirling Gardens. Appraised for conservation work, it is heritage-listed and has a number of histories of both the club and building published.

== See also ==
- Karrakatta Club
- Western Australian Club
