= Military Society =

Swedish military club

Military Club of Stockholm
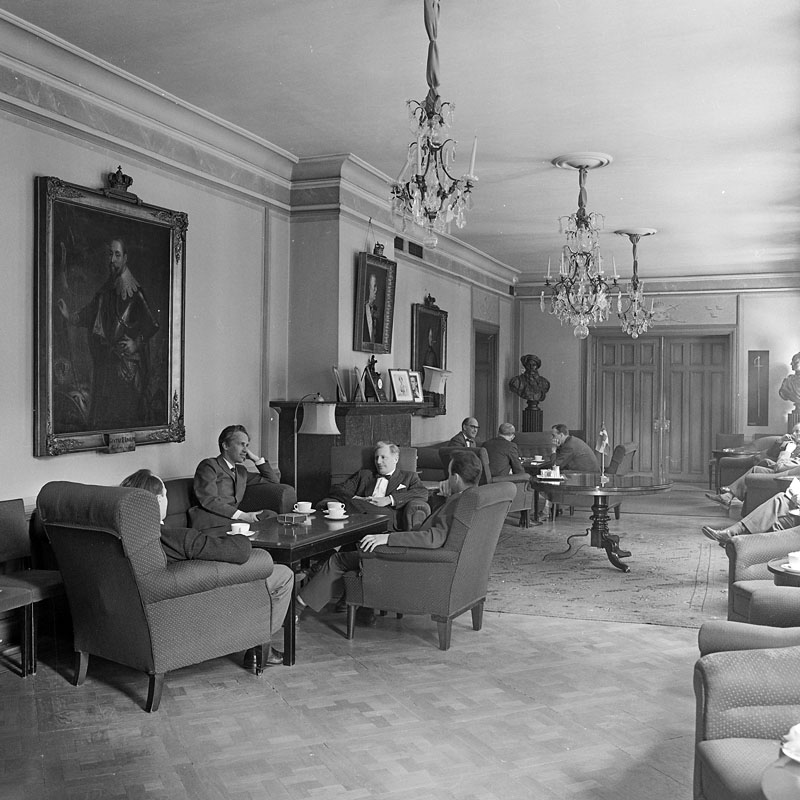
- Interiors of Militärsällskapet in its former premises located at Linnégatan 5, Östermalm, Stockholm (published by Stockholm City Museum).
- Formation: 2 January 1852
- Founder: Lieutenant Joachim Beck-Friis, Life Guards of Horse; Lieutenant Edmond Peyron, Svea Life Guards; Lieutenant Fredric Horn, Andra livgardet
- Location(s): Valhallavägen 104; Stockholm, Sweden
- Website: www.militarsallskapet.se

The Military Club of Stockholm (Swedish: Militärsällskapet i Stockholm) is a Swedish military society founded on 2 January 1852 in Stockholm, Sweden, to "enable officers to meet and exchange views on all matters, thus not only military." It was founded as a military gentlemen's club by Lieutenant Joachim Beck-Friis, Life Guards of Horse, Lieutenant Edmond Peyron, Svea Life Guards and Lieutenant Fredric Horn, Andra livgardet.

There have been several royal links to the society, including Swedish King Oscar II of Sweden, who acted as Chairman 1865-1872 during his time as Crown Prince, as well as the Danish Kings Christian IX and Frederik VIII, who were honorary members.

Membership is open to officers and reserve officers in active duty or retired. The board may also accept others, including organisations and limited companies, as members.

The Military Club of Stockholm maintains reciprocal arrangements with the Royal Air Force Club and Army and Navy Club in London, United Kingdom.
