= Chittagong Club =

Social club in Chittagong, Bangladesh

Chittagong Club Limited
- চট্টগ্রাম ক্লাব লিমিটেড
- Official logo
- Abbreviation: CCL
- Predecessor: Provisional Club
- Formation: 1878; 148 years ago
- Founder: W. A. Campbell
- Founded at: British India (now Chattogram)
- Type: Social club
- Legal status: Active
- Headquarters: Shahid Saifuddin Khaled Road
- Location: Chattogram
- Coordinates: 22.347701°N 91.8197854°E
- Owner: Ministry of Defence
- Chairman: Shobhon M. Shahabuddin (Raj)
- Vice-Chairman: Dr. Mohammed Syedul Anowar (Farhad)
- Website: chittagongclubltd.com

The Chittagong Club is one of the most prominent and prestigious social clubs in Bangladesh. Founded as a gentlemen's club during British rule in 1878, it is one of the oldest elite social clubs in South Asia. It is located at S.S. Khaled Road, Chittagong, Bangladesh.

== History ==
W. W. Campbell, a tea planter in the region opened a club in his lodge in Chittagong in 1875. It was designed to be used by other European planters in the region. The club was converted to Chittagong Club on 23 August 1878. The club was open to only Europeans. The first Honorary Secretary of the club was R. D. Murray.

The importance and growth of Chittagong city lead to an increase in the number of Europeans in the city. The club was moved to the new location to accommodate the new residents. The Club moved to Pioneer Hill, the location of tea plantation founded in 1840. The land was rented to the club by Rai Nityananda Rai Bahadur, a Zamindar. On 27 March 1901, the club was opened at the new location. The club was registered as a company in 1908. Until 1947 membership was open to only Europeans.

The club is located on a major hilltop overlooking the city of Chittagong and the Karnaphuli River.

== See also ==
- Dhaka Club
- Narayanganj Club Ltd
- Jashore Institute
