= Charles Douglas Figgis =

Australian architect

- Born: 1849; Ireland
- Died: 1895 (aged 45–46); Cheltenham
- Occupation: Architect
- Buildings: Ballarat Mining Exchange, The Geelong Club

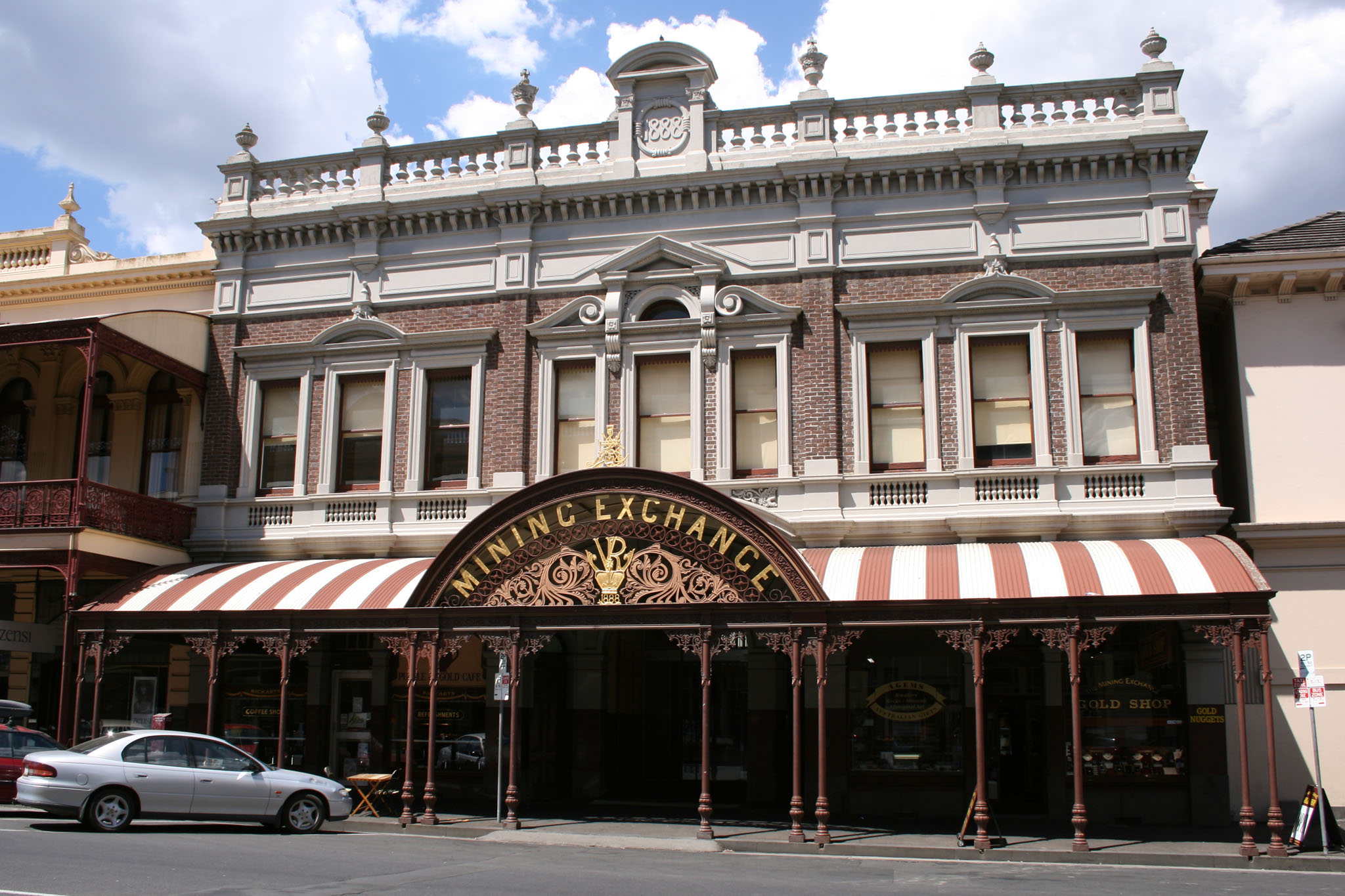
The Mining Exchange, Ballarat, Victoria designed by C.D. Figgis

Charles Douglas Figgis (1849–1895) was an architect active in Melbourne and Ballarat in the late nineteenth century who was a partner in the firm Caselli and Figgis. He was a Fellow of the Royal Victorian Institute of Architects.

== Personal life ==
Figgis was the second son of parents Samuel Figgis and Sarah Figgis (born Smith). He died in 1895 aged 49 and was buried at Cheltenham. He married Zillah Ann Price in 1878. She died in 1939. They had three children: Ruby Kate born 1879, Charles Samuel born 1882 and Irene Sarah born 1886.

== Work ==
Figgis is noted as the architect of a number of important buildings in Ballarat, Victoria including the Ballarat Town Hall interior, the 1888 Ballarat Mining Exchange, The Geelong Club.

Other buildings designed by Figgis include:

- Lutheran Church, Doveton Street South, Ballarat, 1876
- St Andrew's Presbyterian Church tower and spire, Ballarat, 1884
- Ballarat Congregationalist Church, 1862
- Ballarat East Fire Station
- group of villas in Malvern, Victoria, c. 1880.
