= Rand Club =

Coordinates: 26°12′22″S 28°02′29″E

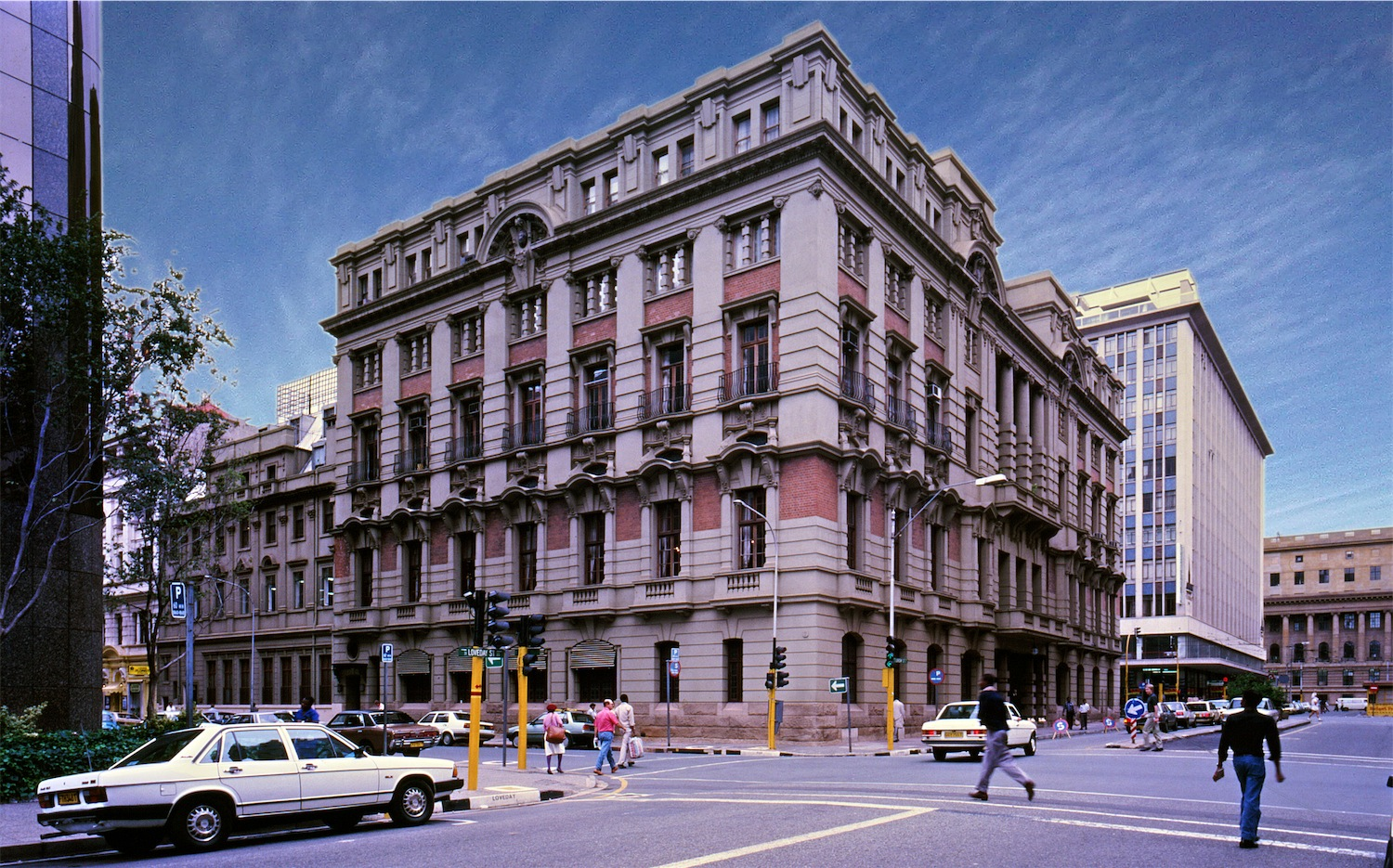
- Rand Club, 33 Loveday St, Marshalltown Johannesburg
- Interactive map of the Rand Club area

General information
- Status: Completed
- Type: Business-use
- Location: Johannesburg, South Africa
- Completed: 1904

Height
- Roof: 34 m (111 ft)

Technical details
- Floor count: 5

Design and construction
- Architects: Leck & Emley

The Rand Club is a private members' club in Johannesburg, South Africa, founded in October 1887. The current (third) clubhouse was designed by architects Leck & Emley in 1902 and its construction completed in 1904. Cecil John Rhodes helped to select the location. Reconceived in 2016, it changed policy to welcome members regardless of race or gender.

== History ==
The club was founded in 1887 only a year after the city of Johannesburg itself was formed. The need for such an establishment was felt as, in the burgeoning gold rush tent town of the time, there was little infrastructure and no suitable locale for distinguished visitors or pioneers to call in or be received at. It is said that Cecil John Rhodes was walking along the newly laid-out Marshall's Township together with Dr Hans Sauer, the first District Surgeon of the Transvaal Republic; both of them stopped at the intersection of what is now Commissioner and Loveday streets, with Rhodes proclaiming that "this place will do for a club.” The official address is 33 Loveday Street, Marshalltown, Johannesburg.

The first subscribers, who became the founding Members, received two plots as a voluntary contribution and purchased two additional ones to ensure that the future building provided spacious facilities. The construction of the first clubhouse promptly began with the erection of a simple single-story structure, housing a bar, a billiards room, four conference rooms, and offices for the chairman and the secretary. This quickly proved inadequate and this structure was demolished to make way for a double-story Victorian building, then deemed the finest in Johannesburg, with colonnaded verandas, trelliswork, French windows, and Corinthian pillars. By 1902, this too proved inadequate and was replaced with the current, third, clubhouse.

The club and its Members have played important parts and have held notable positions in South African history. Mining magnates such as Sir Jilius Jeppe, Sir Hermann Eckstein and Sir Lionel Phillips were instrumental in turning the Witwatersrand into the largest goldfield in the world, as well as for sponsoring the construction of the Johannesburg Art Gallery and donating important pieces of art to it. Rhodes's associate, Dr Leander Starr Jameson, together with his fellow plotters from the Transvaal Reform Committee plotted the overthrow of the government of the Transvaal from the club's Main Bar. The club was one of the targets of the striking miners during the Rand Rebellion of 1922 and was briefly barricaded during the disturbances.

Although once having around 3,000 members, the club had around 450 members in 2025.

== Clubhouse ==
=== Architecture and interiors ===
The current clubhouse was completed in 1904 on the design of prominent architects William Leck and Frank Emley in the Edwardian neo-baroque style. It is said that Emley drew inspiration from Michelangelo’s Church of the Sacred Heart in Florence and from the Reform Club in London. The front façade of the building has a rusticated ground floor and is adorned with porticoes and Doric pillars. A notable feature is the specific incorporation of two half-moon wooden benches flanking the front doors, as by 1904 it was already an established tradition for some members to sit at the front and observe passing street life. The six-story building houses the longest bar in Africa, at 31 metres (103 feet), two kitchens, a billiards room, a wine cellar, a private theatre, a double-volume staircase illuminated by a mosaic dome, a library, a ballroom and the "21 Bar", an armoury, seven conference rooms of various volumes, offices and shop space which are rented to tenants, a second bar with entrance from 97 Fox Street and seven bedroom suites which are available to Members and reciprocal Club Members.

=== Art collection ===
The club's most prominent artwork was a portrait of Queen Elizabeth II by Italian artist Pietro Annigoni. The original was destroyed in the fire that damaged the club in June 2005. A copy was subsequently acquired and is displayed in the Milner Lounge on the first floor. A portrait of Nelson Mandela by South African artist John Meyer was also installed in the club.

The interiors of the Rand Club feature a collection of sculptures and paintings by prominent South African artists, both historical and contemporary. A number of the works are on loan from institutions and companies including Rand Merchant Bank (RMB), Anglo American and OPH.

=== Library ===
The main Buckland Library houses in excess of 10,000 volumes, some of which are of historic and scholarly interest. The club is acknowledged as one of the notable private collections of Africa, with some volumes dating back to the 19th century. Apart from books on Africa, the club is a veritable depository in the fields of Johannesburg history and biographies. With a number of its members being published authors in their own right, the library has a separate section of works by Sir Lionel Phillips and Anthony Akerman, among others.

=== Royal residence ===
The Rand Club was used on two occasions as an official residence for members of the British royal family during official visits to South Africa in the 1920s and 1930s. During her 1947 visit to South Africa, the then Princess Elizabeth became the first woman to enter the club through its main entrance and ascend its main staircase. As the Rand Club was then a men-only institution, Princess Elizabeth did not stay overnight at the club.

== Governance ==
=== General meetings and committee ===
Governance

The governance of the Rand Club is vested in its Members, who exercise their authority through general meetings. An annual general meeting is traditionally held on 20 November, with additional general meetings convened as required.

Members elect a General Committee, which provides oversight of the club's affairs and governance. The day-to-day management of the club is undertaken by a General Manager. As of 2026, the General Manager is Mr Ian Snowball.

=== Internal clubs ===
Rand Club has various clubs within itself, of which the most notable are the Hunting, Shooting & Fishing Club, the Business Club, the Historical Association, the Theatre & Cinema Club, and the Young Members’ Think Tank. Each of these clubs-within-the club hosts its own regular events, dinners, and celebrations.

Reciprocal clubs

The Rand Club has reciprocal arrangements with more than 240 clubs worldwide, allowing its members access to participating clubs in South Africa and internationally.

Rand Club in 2026

By 2026, Rand Club had evolved considerably from its origins as a members-only gentlemen's club. Women have been eligible for membership since 1993, and certain areas of the club are accessible to non-members. The club offers guided tours of its historic premises, which can be combined with lunch.

During 2026, the club expanded its programme of events for Members and guests, with the aim of hosting at least one major event each month and, where possible, two. The club also makes its premises available for film and television productions, which has become an additional source of revenue.

The club continues to undertake membership initiatives and seek corporate sponsorship as part of its efforts to support its ongoing operations and the preservation of its historic premises.

== See also ==
- Durban Club
- Owl Club
