= The Geelong Club =

Private social club in Geelong, Victoria, Australia

Coordinates: 38.14596°S 144.36389°E

- Front of the clubhouse
- Founded: 1859; 167 years ago
- Type: Private members' club
- Location: 74 Brougham Street, Geelong, Victoria, Australia
- Website: thegeelongclub.com

The Geelong Club is a private social club originally established in 1859 originally as the Western Club, since most of its members were from outside Geelong in the Western District. After a period of inactivity the club reformed in 1874, and then again in 1881, when a group of gentlemen committed to an ongoing organisation. The present organisation dates is foundation from this year. The club is a symbol of Australia's British heritage and Western District pastoralists.

== Foundation and history ==
The Club was formed by a group of Geelong wool merchants and Western District pastoralists with a foundation membership of about 70. It initially met in local hotel rooms, and in May 1860 a two-storey building at 58 Yarra Street was rented. financial difficulties and low membership caused the club to move its meetings to Mack’s Hotel in Brougham Street, in April 1864, selling its furniture, fittings, bedding, cutlery, etc. in the process. Activities petered out in the 1860s, but the Club revived in 1874, moving to Fassert’s Patisserie at 109 Ryrie Street but disbanded a year later when Fassert’s café closed due to financial difficulties. Graham Berry MLA, was inaugural President of this second Geelong Club.

== Re-establishment ==
On 3 August 1881 a public meeting was called to re-establish the Geelong Club. Woolbroker, Edward Lascelles was prominent in this and is now considered the founder of the Club. Prominent politician and grazier William Robertson was inaugural Club President. The Club purchased Mack’s Hotel, occupying half of the building for its rooms comprising dining room, bar, billiard room, card room, smoking room, reading room, and accommodation. as well as a second new billiard room at the rear. The other half of the building remained a working hotel.

In 1888-1889 the Club erected its present building at 74 Brougham Street, Geelong, Victoria, to provide improved facilities including a foyer, reading, dining, billiard, smoking and sleeping rooms committee room and steward’s bedroom. It was first occupied on 19 October 1889.

The building was in a Classical Boom period style sometimes referred to as "Transitional Queen Anne". It was built by local contractor, J. C. Taylor to designs by noted Ballarat and Melbourne architect, Charles Douglas Figgis. It is a two storey brick structure on an asymmetrical plan with a highly decorative facade featuring a monumental verandah and broken pediment gable. It is included on the Victorian Heritage Register. A small set of iron gates were installed at the top of the front steps in 1895 to keep out the wandering dogs, which were a local nuisance at the time.

== Notable members ==
Membership has included many prominent Victorian citizens, in particular some key figures of the nineteenth century Geelong and Western District wool industry including merchant, woolbroker and politician, James Ford Strachan, three-time Victoria premier Graham Berry, woolbrokers C J Dennys, EH Lascelles, and A C Ibbotsen, pastoralists AA Austin of Barwon Park, FF Armytage, Robert and Andrew Chirnside of Werribee Park, and Sir WJ Clarke of Rupertswood, Francis Ormond, principal of The Geelong College George Morrison, TP Manifold of Purrumbeete, and WR Wilson of St Albans. Sir Charles Sladen, Victorian Premier Sir Henry Bolte, and Australian Governor-General Lord Casey were all members in the 20th century.
