= Avari Hotels =

Pakistani hotel chain

Avari Hotels International

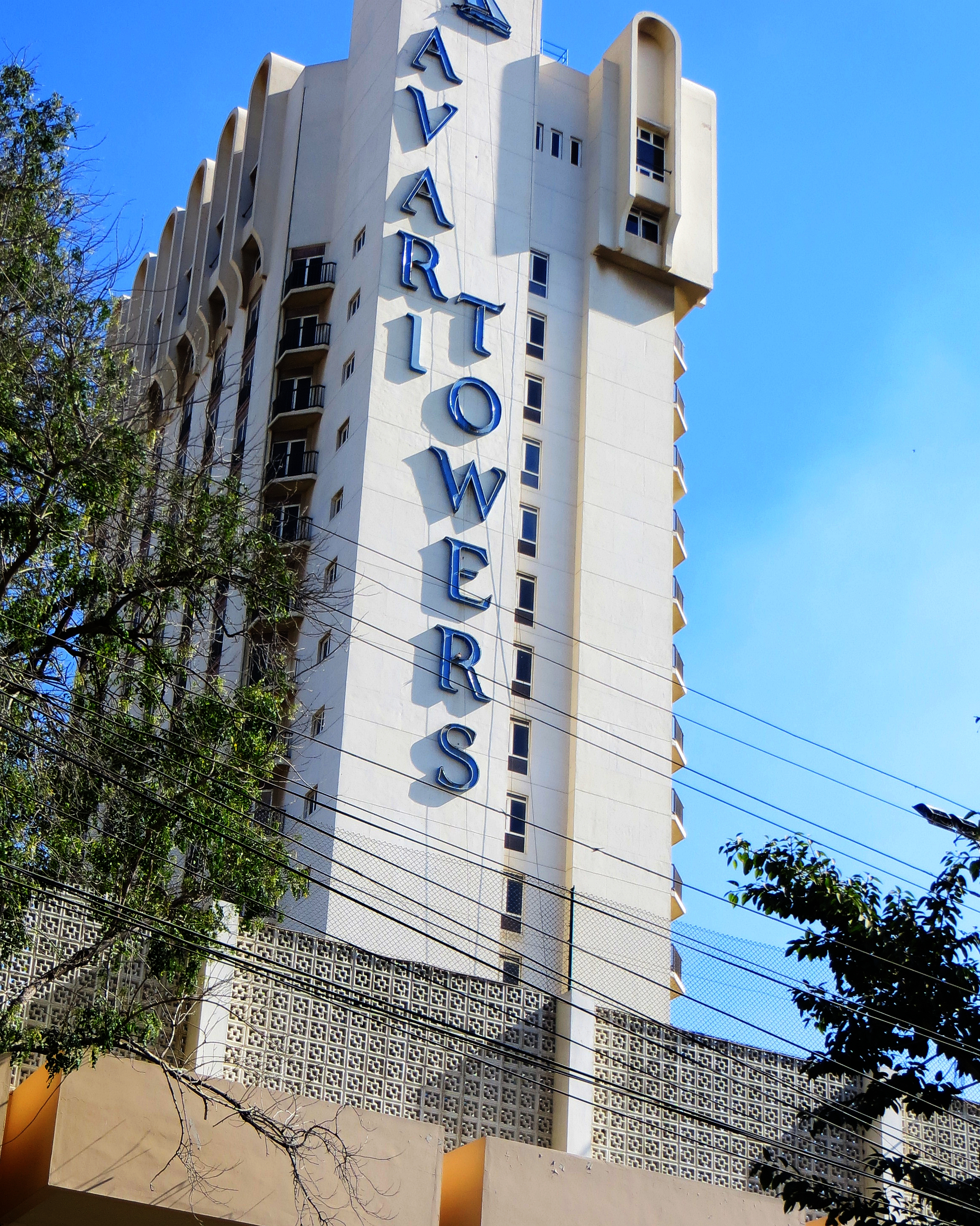
- Type: Private
- Industry: Hospitality
- Founded: March 1948
- Founder: Dinshaw Avari
- Headquarters: Karachi-75530, Pakistan
- Key people: Dinshaw Avari (Chairman)
- Number of employees: c. 2000
- Website: avari.com

Avari Hotels (Urdu: آواری ہوٹل) is a Pakistani international hotel chain based in Karachi. It operates five hotel properties in Pakistan, a duo in Dubai, and one in Toronto.

== History ==
Avari Hotels Group was founded in March 1948 by Dinshaw Avari who was originally from Bombay.

Avari Hotels first location was the Beach Luxury Hotel in Karachi which opened on 21 March 1948. Later, Avari Hotel Lahore was opened in 1978 and the 17-story Avari Tower Hotel with 120 suites in Karachi in 1985.

In 2013, the group announced the launch of a major expansion phase. In 2017, Avari Hotels announced the opening of two 4-star hotels in Multan.

== Ownership ==
The hotel chain is owned by the Parsi Avari family and which was led by Byram D. Avari until his death in 2023.

== Locations ==
- Avari Towers Hotel, Karachi
- Hotel Crown Inn, Karachi
- Avari Hotel, Lahore
