= Karjalatalo =

Building in Helsinki, Finland; owned by the Karelian Association

Coordinates: 60.2151°N 24.9569°E

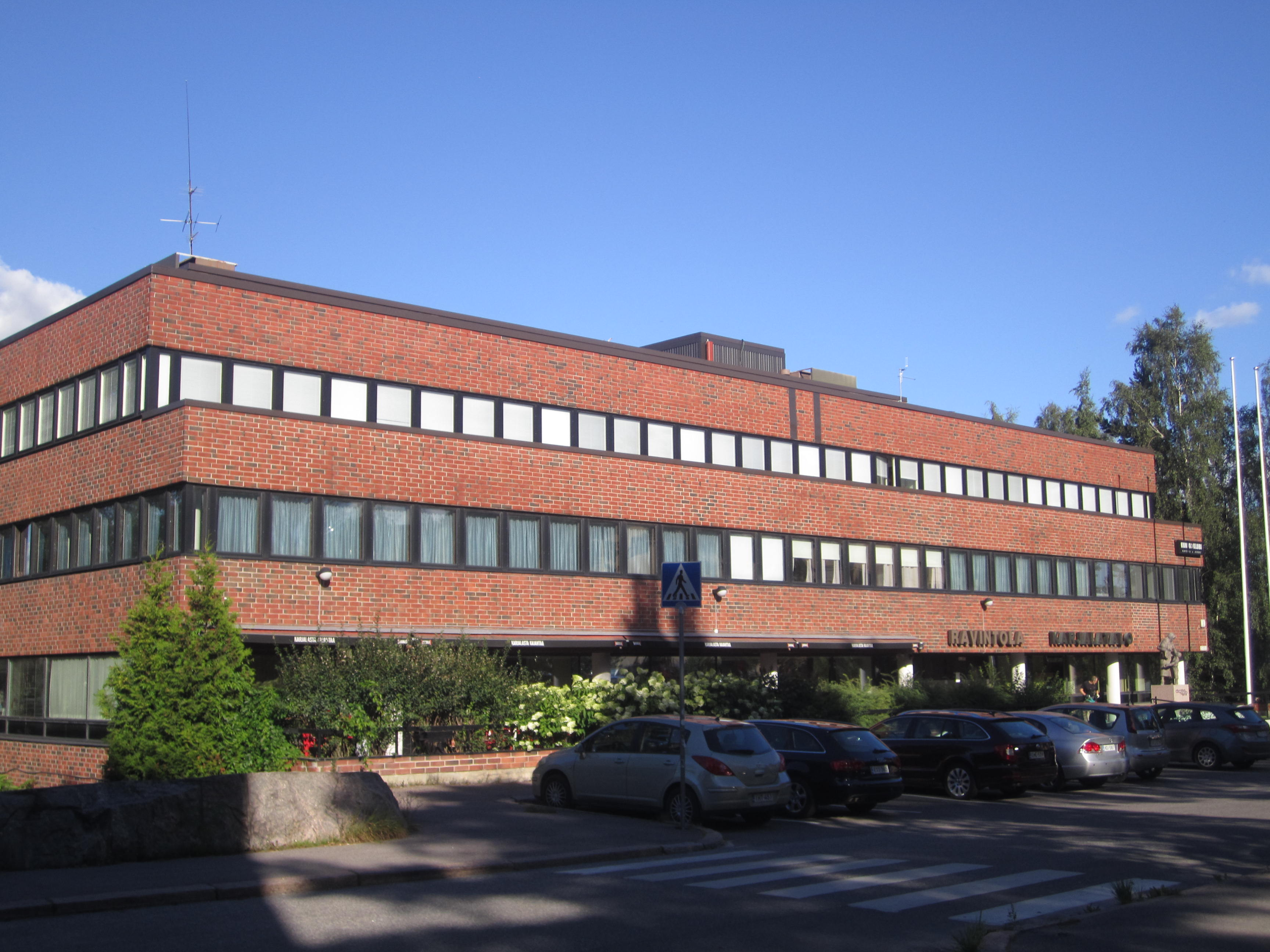

Karjalatalo (in English: Karelia House) is a red brick building in the Käpylä neighbourhood of Helsinki, Finland. It is owned by the Karelian Association, who built it as a meeting place for the Finnish Karelians who were displaced during World War II and their descendants. Designed by architect Into Pyykkö, construction of the building began in 1972 and completed in 1974. The interior design by Maisa Laaksonen features large amounts of pine, as well as the colours red, black and green.

The location of the building was heavily debated before construction began, with Lappeenranta a serious contender until the city of Helsinki donated a suitable plot of land for the building effort. The association chose Käpylä as its location because it is situated in a scenic area.

The Karelian Association, founded in 1940, operated at Bensow's House on Eteläesplanadi in Helsinki. The premises became cramped, which led the association to decide to construct its own building. The association launched a fundraising campaign, fronted by the Speaker of the Finnish Parliament, V.J. Sukselainen, and Prime Minister Rafael Paasio. As part of the campaign, artists held a music concert at Finlandia Hall. Municipalities, companies, and private individuals contributed donations.

The building effort received significant amounts of private donations. Approximately 200,000 Mk were obtained from municipalities around Finland, who were asked to donate one markka per Karelian evacuee living in the municipality in 1960.

In addition to being used by the Karelian Association, the building is used Viipurin Lauluveikot as a practice facility, along with having an ecumenical chapel.

The Industrialists' and Businessmen's Society Pamaus (Teollisuuden- ja liikkeenharjoittajain Seura Pamaus), founded in 1891 in Viipuri during the era of the Grand Duchy of Finland, holds events at Karjalatalo. Emperor Alexander III of Russia and the Imperial Senate of Finland approved the founding of the society. At the founding meeting, there were 30 members. Among the founders were industrialist Karl Alfred Paloheimo and cultural influencer Johan Henrik Erkko. Merchant and benefactor Juha Lallukka served as the society's chairman. The society owns a significant art collection.

Sculpture Evakkoäiti (Evacuee Mother) by Juhani Honkanen in front of Karjalatalo. The sculpture was unveiled in 2015. The base reads: 'Although our home was left behind, life lay ahead of us.'
