= Western Australian Club =

Defunct Perth, Western Australian social club

- Formation: 1893
- Defunct: 2019
- Type: Social club
- Location: Perth, Western Australia
- Website: waclubheritage.com.au

The Western Australian Club was a social club founded in Perth, Western Australia in 1893. Named Exchange Club until 1897, and then West Australian Club until 1979, it ceased operating in 2019.

== History ==
The Western Australian Club began in 1893 as a gentlemen's club in the shape of a limited company with capital of five hundred pounds divided into 500 shares of £1 each. The original Memorandum of Association described the purpose as:

For the purpose of establishing a Club of a non political character for the accommodation and mutual benefit and privilege of the members of the Company and to provide a Club house and other accommodation and convenience for the use of the members of the Company and to furnish and maintain the same and to permit the same to be used by the members of the Company.

By 1894 there were 310 members, drawn from the rich and powerful of Western Australia. The gentlemen's club ethos was well established:

Members puffed imported cigars, drank the finest wines and spirits and ate the best food from fine bone china set down on crisp white linen cloths, sparkling with sterling silver cutlery. It was a haven for kindred spirits, a place to rub shoulders with the colony’s leading men free from the distraction of women, rowdy children and demanding workers. A strict code of conduct ensured that bad language, insulting behaviour, drunkenness and other unacceptable acts were quickly dealt with by the club’s committee.

In the 1950s membership continued to include many names from business, development, politics and the history of Western Australia. The financial fortunes of the club also tended to rise and fall with the fortunes of the state.

By the 1960s the state itself was changing. There was rapid economic growth in non-traditional areas. This growth brought new people to the state. The club, perhaps because it included accommodation for members, kept its existing members but had difficulty attracting new members:

While there is no evidence that the club was actually formed to meet the needs of pastoralists and graziers visiting Perth from the far reaches the State, the club has until recent years drawn its membership largely from the rural districts... They found warm and comfortable accommodation, good food, cards, billiards and a well-stocked bar. More importantly they found companionship.

The economic growth of the state also brought increased competition for club services. In order to survive and grow, the club made changes to its role, its rules and its services. In the mid 1970s,

members expected the best services and facilities yet were critical of the efforts of management and the Committee to deal with finances in difficult times.

There was a financial crisis, yet the club survived.

By the 1980s, the Western Australian Club was no longer strictly a "gentlemen's club". Women were full members. Pastoralist and country members were less than one fifth of membership. Despite the changes, many traditional aspects of the club were maintained. In 1988 the club president wrote,

The goal of the club must always be to provide an atmosphere in which men [and women] (Note: The actual reference was to "men". As in the general community, language equality trailed after intentions.) of integrity, ability and capacity can find relaxation and mental stimulation from mixing with their peers with ultimate benefit to the whole community.

After the club changed premises, fitting out the new premises, hosted regular events with meals and expert speakers, making rooms available for meetings, the club became defunct in 2019.

=== Membership ===
Original members of the club included John Forrest and his brother Alexander. Other significant business and political leaders belonging to the club included:

- J. B. Hardwick,
- A. B. Bunning,
- George Shenton
- Newton Moore
- Edward Wittenoom
- Ross McLarty
- Charles Court as Honorary Life Member

== Publications ==
- Annual Report
- Newsletter
- Rules
