= Calcutta Club =

Social club in Kolkata, India

Calcutta Club (Bengali: কলকাতা ক্লাব) is an elite gentlemen's club located on Lower Circular Road in Kolkata (formerly Calcutta), India. It was established in 1907 and the first president of the club was the Maharajah of Cooch Behar, Sir Nripendra Narayan. The Prince of Wales, later King Edward VIII of Great Britain, was among the first royal guests to visit the club when he was invited to a lunch on 28 December 1921. First prime minister of India Pandit Jawaharlal Nehru visited the club in 1961. The club has always maintained distinguished members from every community - from Maharaja of Coochbehar to Maharaja of Burdwan, Maharaja of Darbhanga, Nawab Sir KGM Faroqui of Ratanpur to Bhupendra Nath Bose, President of the Indian National Congress to Indian economist and philosopher Amartya Sen. Internationally acclaimed artists like Gaganendranath Tagore and Abanindranath Tagore were regular visitors to the club, as was Oscar award-winning legendary film-maker Satyajit Ray, longest-serving chief minister of West Bengal Jyoti Basu. In 2007, 11th president of India Dr. A. P. J. Abdul Kalam visited the club to launch the centenary scholarship fund. Other notable visitors to the club include prominent Indian artists and celebrities such as Amitabh Bachchan and his wife Jaya Bhaduri. Today Calcutta Club stands as an iconic landmark in Kolkata and represents the elite Bengal with rich history and culture, and also referred as "The Grand Duke of all Clubs".

== History ==
Although not the oldest private members club in the city, it is notable because it was formed at a time when the existing Bengal Club only admitted whites as members. Lord Minto, the Viceroy and Governor-General of India at the time, had wished to invite Sir Rajen Mookerjee to dine at the Bengal Club and, when the discriminatory policy was thus exposed, a decision was taken to form a club with a membership policy not dictated by race. The club had historically restricted membership to men. However, this was changed in 2007 and the club started admitting women members. The club also has reviewed its child policy and has started admitting children above the age of twelve years of age at all times since very recently.

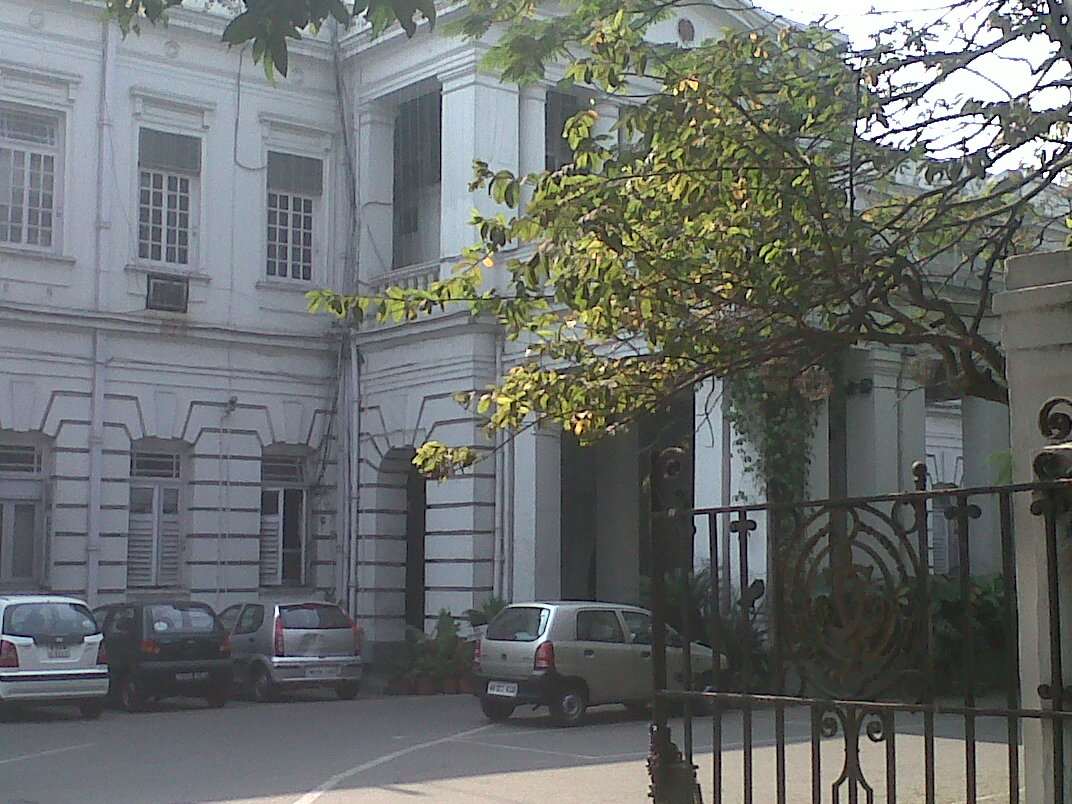
Calcutta Club, Kolkata

== The Club House ==
The historic clubhouse is accessible to its members. Facilities for members include Residential Rooms, Banquet & Conference, Tennis Court, Health Club, Billiard Room, Card Room, Swimming Pool, a Parlour and a Barber Shop. The Club's main dining hall, the Coffee Room, serves authentic continental dishes and English dinner. The hall is well-lit with antique and vintage chandeliers and retains its traditional and cultural values. The clubhouse runs a bakery exclusive to its members, offering savoury pastries, croissants, cookies and bread. The club also has a Chinese restaurant, a Tandoor Corner, and a Wine and Cigar Bar. The clubhouse also maintains a library for reading and pleasure. The club has a stunning collection of silver services, including silverware used only on special events, such as the lunch session held for Prince Andrew, Duke of York and other special club occasions.

Recently the club has taken green initiatives for the future such as solar power generation, a compost plant to turn waste into manure, rainwater harvesting and also sewage treatment to reduce its carbon footprint and for efficient waste management. The century old club house has maintained a large heritage building since the British Raj, and a large treasure of antiquities of about 100 paintings and prints, priceless porcelain Ming vases and garden stools that arrived at the club from Cooch Behar Palace and the Burdwan Maharajas. The club reflects vignettes of social life of the European and Indian elite.

== Membership ==
Membership to the Calcutta Club remains a highly exclusive affair that allows only the elite section of the society, industrialists, the powerful bureaucrats or diplomats of India, eminent scientists, scholars, artists or highly regarded practitioners in field of medicine. To gain a new membership of the club, it can take from years up to a decade sometimes depending on whether the applicant has recommendations of family members associated with the club or has a prominent standing in the society through their work. The club gives honorary membership only in special cases, like Amartya Sen, an Indian economist and philosopher, was awarded an honorary membership of the club after winning Nobel Memorial Prize in Economic Sciences.

== Events at Calcutta Club ==
Along with Victoria Memorial, Kolkata and Bengal Club, Calcutta Club has hosted Tata Steel Kolkata Literary Meet on several years.

The Telegraph National Debate at Calcutta Club brings Indian thought leaders and intellectuals from different and diversified arenas of political beliefs, opinions, and affiliations every year to discuss about the current issues in India.

- 2017 speakers: Indian yoga guru and founder of Patanjali Ayurved Baba Ramdev, student leader Kanhaiya Kumar, Harvard professor, historian and politician Prof. Sugata Bose, politician Sambit Patra, fashion designer and politician Shaina Nana Chudasama.
- 2018 speakers: Indian politician, author, scholar, and former international diplomat Shashi Tharoor, former Bengal chief secretary Ardhendu Sen, Patidar Anamat Andolan Samiti leader Hardik Patel, moderator Sandip Chatterjee, MP Tarun Vijay, MP Swapan Dasgupta and MP Meenakshi Lekhi.
- 2019 speakers: Bengal finance minister and former secretary general of FICCI Dr. Amit Mitra, Indian actor and politician Shatrughan Sinha, Indian lawyer and politician Abhishek Singhvi, Former director of Infosys and chairman of Manipal University, Karnataka T. V. Mohandas Pai, author and editor Prafulla Ketkar, Indian politician K. C. Tyagi.
- 2020 speakers: Indian actor Swara Bhaskar, Indian politician and AITMC General Secretary Abhishek Banerjee, Kashmir activist Sushil Pandit, industrialist and politician Shishir Bajoria, student leader of JNU Aishe Ghosh, Former vice-chancellor of Jadavpur University Prof. Abhijit Chakrabarti.
- 2021 speakers: Former governor of Tripura and Meghalaya Tathagata Roy, industrialist Harshavardhan Neotia, Economist Prasenjit K Basu, MP Mahua Moitra, Cardiac surgeon Kunal Sarkar, Supreme Court advocate Sanjay R Hegde.
- 2023 speakers: Indian Marxist economist Prabhat Patnaik, Abhirup Sarkar of Indian Statistical Institute, Rajya Sabha MP Jawhar Sircar, former Prasar Bharti chief and retired Indian bureaucrat, Sanjaya Baru, columnist, author and former media adviser to the then Prime Minister Manmohan Singh, Koushik Chatterjee, executive director and chief financial officer of Tata Steel, and Rudra Chatterjee, managing director of Luxmi Group.

In February 2023, The Indian Express Group organized a round table conference at the Calcutta Club to shape Kolkata’s journey in becoming a medical hub of the southeast Asia.

Also in 2023, this was for the first time, ever since the club introduced its international evening in 1979, an Education Conclave was held with focus on education that is key in nation-building, in collaboration with Techno India Group. The International Evening of the club is an annual food and entertainment event that has observed continuous participation by foreign Consulates-General. The Royal Thai Consulate-General in Kolkata started participating at the club's international evening since 2020. Earlier Consulate of Italy in Kolkata organised “The Italian cuisine in 7 points” to meet with the eminent of the city.

== Reciprocal clubs ==
Reciprocal clubs of the Calcutta Club include some of the notable prestigious social clubs in the world such as National Liberal Club, London, Oxford and Cambridge Club of the UK, Royal Over-Seas League, London, and Raffles Town Club of Singapore.
