= Narayanganj Club Limited =

Social club in Narayanganj, Bangladesh

- নারায়ণগঞ্জ ক্লাব লিমিটেড
- Abbreviation: NCL
- Predecessor: Narayanganj European Club
- Formation: 1893; 132 years ago
- Founded at: British India (now Narayanganj Bangladesh)
- Type: Social
- Legal status: Active
- Headquarters: Bangabandhu Road
- Location: Narayanganj
- President: Alhaj M. Solaiman
- Website: narayanganjclubltd.com

Narayanganj Club Limited is a social club in Bangladesh. It was originally established as the European Club in Narayanganj during the period of British rule in India in 1893.

== History ==
Narayanganj Club Limited was established in 14 February 1893 Sunday as the European Club in Narayanganj. Initially, membership of the club was restricted to individuals from Great Britain and Ireland, and Indians were not allowed to become members; the club was expanded in 1905. During the Second World War, the club allowed some Australians and Americans to become members. In 1947 following the partition of India, membership of the club was opened to Indians. Narayanganj Club was described as livelier than Dacca Club by S. N. Maitra in his autobiographical book A Collector's Piece. He described Scots, engaged in the jute trade, celebrating St. Andrew's Day with dancing and Scotch whisky.

The second annual meeting of the Jute Association was held in Narayanganj Club on 8 December 1951 under the president of the Association, M. M. Ispahani.

In 1967, the first Bengali president, M. A. Sattar was elected.

In December 1972, Minister of Information Mizanur Rahman Chowdhury spoke at the two-day conference of the Bangladesh Journalists Association, which was held at the club. He assured them that freedom of the press would be respected in the newly independent Bangladesh.

In December 2007, Kashem Jamal, who was the vice-president of the Bangladesh Knitwear Manufacturers and Exporters Association, was elected president of Narayanganj Club.

In 2010, the National Women's Chess Championship was held at the club.

Membership stood at 250 in 1992 and had increased to 1400 in 2014. On 19 July 2016, during the attacks by Islamic extremists in Bangladesh from 2015 to 2016, Narayanganj Club received a letter from the Islamic State affiliate in Bangladesh that threatened to kill 20 members of the club. In 2018, an audit by SH Khan & Co found financial irregularities in the club's finances.

In 2018, Narayanganj Club became the runners-up in the snooker team championship held at Dhaka Club. During the July 2024 protests against Prime Minister Sheikh Hasina, the Club was vandalised, and two motorcycles were burned down, causing damage worth 9 million BDT in properties.

== See also ==
- Dhaka Club
- Chittagong Club
- Jashore Institute
