= Karachi Boat Club =

Rowing club in Karachi

- کلب کشتی رانی کراچی
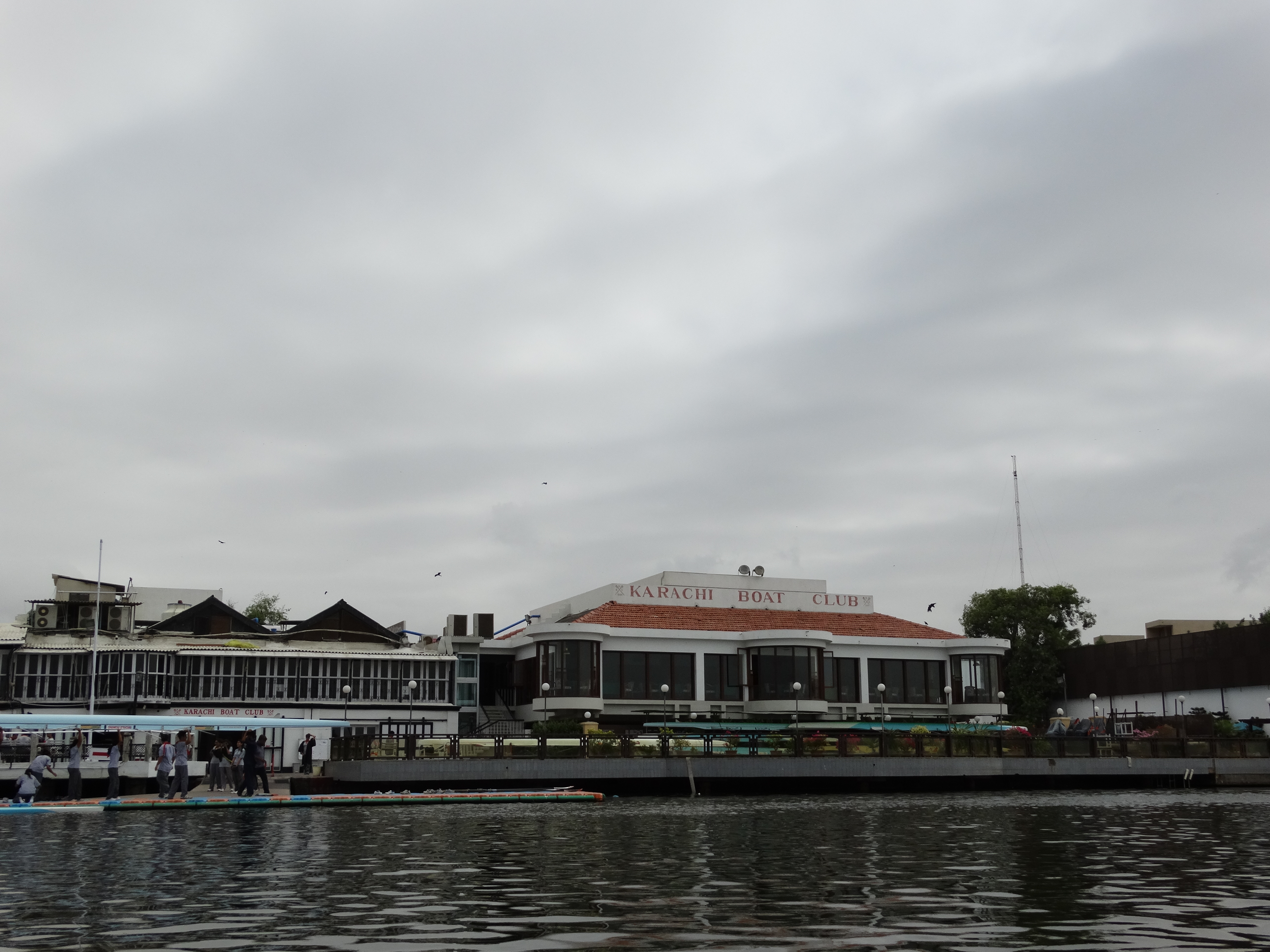
- Location: Lalazar, Karachi, Pakistan
- Coordinates: 24.84092°N 66.99775°E
- Home water: Chinna Creek
- Founded: 1881
- Key people: Kazi Asad Abid (President); Arif Ikram (Captain of Boats)
- Membership: Members-only club
- Colours: red and white
- Affiliations: Pakistan Rowing Federation; Asian Schools' Rowing Association (ASRA); The Far Eastern Amateur Rowing Association (FEARA)
- Website: www.kbc.org.pk
- Acronym: KBC

Events
- First regatta held on 18 October 1881.; Inter-School Regatta; International Inter-School Regatta; Spring Regatta

The Karachi Boat Club (KBC) is a rowing club situated in Karachi, Pakistan. Established in 1881, the club is located on the shores of the Chinna Creek, a coastal lagoon adjacent to the Arabian Sea harbour.

The club's colonial-era waterfront building, built in the mock-Tudor style, overlooks the creek. Its facilities now include a gym added in 2002, a swimming pool added in 2005, indoor rowing machines, and rowing boats spanning several categories; the grounds and restaurant also host social events.

The Karachi Boat Club has hosted national and international regattas, including an annual international regatta that has drawn overseas crews such as a Russian delegation in 2025. Its own athletes have competed in, and won medals at, national and international competitions, including the 2008 National Rowing Championship in Islamabad and the 2011 ARAE/FEARA Regatta in Sri Lanka.

== History ==
Organised rowing in Karachi has roots dating back to 1866, when a cup was awarded for a fours race at a regatta held that year. The Karachi Boat Club itself was re-formed at a meeting on 19 July 1881, attended by fifteen British men who became its founding membership; the club's own records describe this as the club being "again formed", implying an earlier, undocumented iteration.

From the outset, the boat-house, described in 1890 as "a pretty châlet of wood", served a social function as a meeting place for the privileged of the day.

== See also ==
- Karachi Yacht Club
