= Durban Club =

Club in Durban, South Africa

Coordinates: 29°51′40″S 31°01′28″E

- Website: www.durbanclub.co.za

Durban Club

General information
- Status: Completed
- Type: Business-use
- Location: Durban, South Africa

In May 1854 Durban had a population of 1,204 settlers which meant that it qualified to be elevated to the status of a Borough. On 14 June 1854, 20 prominent Durban residents signed an agreement to form the first D'Urban Club, named after Sir Benjamin D'Urban, Governor of the Cape Colony. The newly formed club was to be used for the playing of billiards, chess and as a reading and newsroom.

In February 1855 a piece of land was purchased in Smith Street from the widow Strydom for £15. The clubhouse they built was a wood and thatch structure measuring 30 feet (9.1 m) by 20 feet (6.1 m). The walls and "bafta" ceilings were covered in Sanderson's wallpaper. The ground was hardened with lime refuse and the property was enclosed with 51 yards (47 m) of post and rail fencing.

In 1861 the members decided that a new, more permanent clubhouse needed to be built. They bought a piece of land adjoining the first clubhouse for £1,045 and a new double story clubhouse was built. The Natal Mercury of October 2, 1863 described it "The new club, with its handsome pilastered front, is taken altogether, the finest building in town." In 1879 the club was extended by duplicating the frontage of the building westward with a porch and vestibule in between. The new wing replaced the old wood and thatch building which had housed the billiard room and library.

In 1898 plans were drawn for a new club to be built on land bought for £8,000 behind the existing clubhouse. The Second Boer War broke out in 1899 and work was delayed until October 1900. The present clubhouse was finally completed and occupied in January 1904. The new clubhouse is of Edwardian, free Renaissance style with capitals, arches, pilasters and mouldings. The hardwood doors in the main foyer had to be carved on the curve and the staircase, with its modern hand joined balustrade was greatly admired. The beautifully carved fireplaces are fully functional.

The stables were converted in 1917 to house member's cars and this garage was enlarged and improved in 1922 and 1928. A squash court was built in 1922 and this is now the laundry. In 1939 an ambitious project was undertaken to build 23 new bedrooms over the existing clubhouse. A new dining suite was built and a new, larger bar was built in the courtyard. In 1956 the upstairs snack lounge and veranda was converted into a grill room to include amenities for women.

From the early days of the second clubhouse, women were allowed to attend functions and dinners at the clubhouse. From 1911, Wednesday nights became "ladies nights". Women were not allowed to become full members of the club until July 1994. In 1997 it was proposed that the Durban Club be sold to a hotel group who would preserve and refurbish it, incorporating it into the construction on the site of a 17 story 5 star hotel. The Durban Club was to continue to function in a limited way and would be a client of the hotel. This arrangement fell through and the following year a second bid was made to purchase the club from the members. This bid also fell through and a new committee was formed to turn the Club around. The club has undergone extensive refurbishment and improvements during the past year. In 2003 the building was sold and the Durban Club obtained a 99-year lease on part of the building.

The facilities of the Club include an ongoing arrangement with the Durban Manor, which now owns the building, to provide accommodation on a Bed and breakfast basis for club members and reciprocity members in the bedroom wing of the building which has 21 bedrooms of three star rating, all with bathrooms.

== See also ==
- Rand Club Building
