= Jadunath Majumdar =

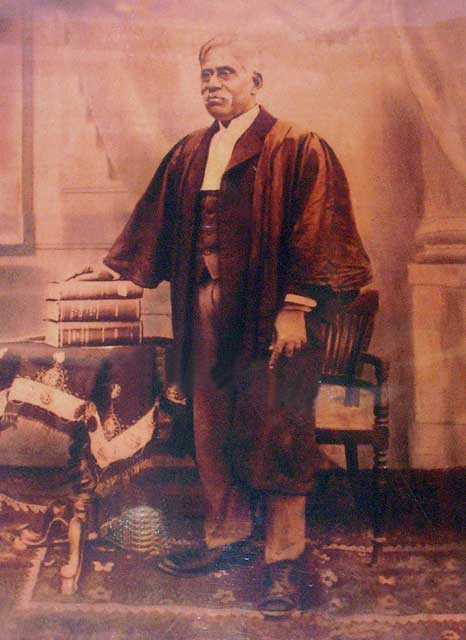
- Born: 23 October 1859; Narail, Presidency Division, British India
- Died: 24 October 1932 (aged 73); Magura, Presidency Division, British India
- Occupations: Journalist, editor of the Tribune
- Known for: Member of First Legislative Assembly, the Bengal Legislative Council.

Jadunath Majumdar, Rai Bahadur (23 October 1859 – 24 October 1932) was a Bengali journalist and writer. He was the editor of the Tribune in Lahore, United India, and the Hindu Patrika of Jessore. Majumdar was also the founder of the journal, Sanmilani, in Jessore. He became a member of the first Legislative Assembly and the Bengal Legislative Council.

He was born at Lohagara, Narail.

Majumdar died at the age of 74 on 24 October 1932 at Rajbati Magura then a subdivision of Jessore district of undivided Bengal (now in Bangladesh).
