= Karachi Yacht Club =

Yacht club in Karachi

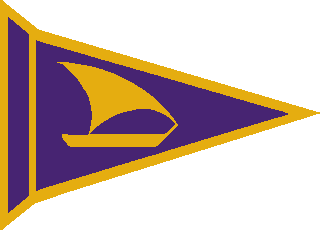
Burgee of Karachi Yacht Club.

The Karachi Yacht Club, formerly known as Karachi Sailing Club, is a yacht club located in Karachi, Sindh, Pakistan.

== History ==
It was founded in 1911 as Karachi Sailing Club. The club's premises were originally situated at Manora.

== See also ==
- Karachi Boat Club
- Yacht club
