= Justin Smith (milliner) =

British milliner

Justin Smith (born in 1978) is a British milliner based in London, who creates bespoke millinery under the J Smith Esquire brand for private clients and films. Smith's hats have appeared in exhibits and been acquired by the Fashion Institute of Technology in New York and the Victoria & Albert Museum in London. He has been a visiting lecturer at London's Royal College of Art and has conducted seminars and teaching workshops for the British Council.

== Early life ==
From 1998 to 2002, Smith served as the Creative Director and Head of Avant Garde for the Toni & Guy Group. Following this, in 2003, he founded his own J Smith Esquire hairdressing salon in London's Soho, focusing on conceptual and avant-garde styles, session styling for the style press, advertising campaigns, and private clients. He was a finalist for the British Hairdressing Awards in 2001 as Avant-Garde Hairdresser of the Year and won the first prize at the 2000 London Alternative Hair Show Smith is a graduate of the London College of Fashion, Kensington and Chelsea College, and Royal College of Art, where he obtained an MA in Millinery in 2007.

== Millinery career ==
Smith established J Smith Esquire in 2007, following his Royal College of Art graduation collection called Le Cirque Macabre. The brand has produced sixteen collections since its launch.

Hats by J Smith Esquire have been shown at London, Paris and Milan fashion weeks, as well as Rome Couture and Jakarta Fashion Week. He has collaborated with designers including Stella McCartney, Moschino, Manish Arora, Oscar Lawalata, Aganovich, Emilio de la Morena and Aveda.

In 2011, a retrospective exhibition, installation, and book launch took place at the Royal Horseguards Hotel, London, including five bespoke doorman hats made for the hotel group. In 2012, as part of London's Jubilee celebrations, Smith was invited to take part in BT Artbox, transforming a replica phone kiosk, and Hatwalk, commissioned by the Mayor of London, in partnership with BT and Grazia magazine, putting a hat on the statue of Queen Victoria on London's Blackfriars Bridge.

In 2012, Smith created the leather head wraps for Angelina Jolie in Maleficent on which he worked in collaboration with the actor. Since Maleficent he has also produced hats for Jolie and Brad Pitt in By The Sea; for Amanda Seyfried, Kathy Burke and ensemble nuns in Pan; and Armie Hammer and Alicia Vikander in The Man from U.N.C.L.E.

Neil Tennant, Kelis and Matthew Herbert have worn Smith's hats during live performances.

== Awards ==
Smith was awarded the 2016 Generali Future Award by International Talent Support at a live presentation in Trieste, Italy in July 2016. Smith also won the Maria Louisa and I-D Styling awards by International Talent Support in 2007. His previous awards include "Young Fashion Entrepreneur of the Year" Award for 2011 awarded by the British Council and New Generation sponsorship and inclusion over several years in the Hedonism millinery collective, awarded by the British Fashion Council.
