= George Parker Tuxford =

George Parker Tuxford (ca.1810 – 24 October 1870) of Barnes, London, was a British magazine publisher.

Born in Boston, Lincolnshire, the eldest son of John Tuxford, George was a co-proprietor with John Rogerson (c. 1884 – 11 May 1851) of the English agricultural newspaper Mark Lane Express, cofounded by Cuthbert William Johnson (1799–1878), brother of George W. Johnson, and William Shaw and edited by Shaw, and the Farmers' Magazine with offices at 246 The Strand.

A frequent contributor to these magazines was Henry Hall Dixon (1822–1870), an entertaining writer on country matters. Tuxford and Rogerson also published the New Sporting Magazine.

He was also a founder and for many years a director of Farmers' Insurance Office, an early member of the Farmers Club, and a Life Governor of the Royal Agricultural Society of England.

== Family ==
Tuxford was the eldest brother of the Hon. William Wedd Tuxford (died 28 January 1878), John Lefevre Tuxford (died 29 June 1887) and Walsingham Weston Tuxford (died 2 December 1875), all of whom emigrated to Adelaide, South Australia and achieved a measure of importance in the new colony. His sister Hannah Parker Tuxford married Rev. Joseph Whitehead, of Spilsby, Lincolnshire.
