= Tuxford (disambiguation) =

Tuxford is a town in Nottinghamshire, England.

Tuxford may also refer to:

- Tuxford, Saskatchewan, community in Canada
- George Tuxford (1870–1942), Canadian brigadier of the First World War
- George Parker Tuxford (ca.1810–1870), English magazine publisher
- William Wedd Tuxford (1826–1878), South Australian industrialist and parliamentarian
