= Whitehall Court =

Mixed-use building in the City of Westminster, London

Coordinates: 51.5057°N 0.1241°W

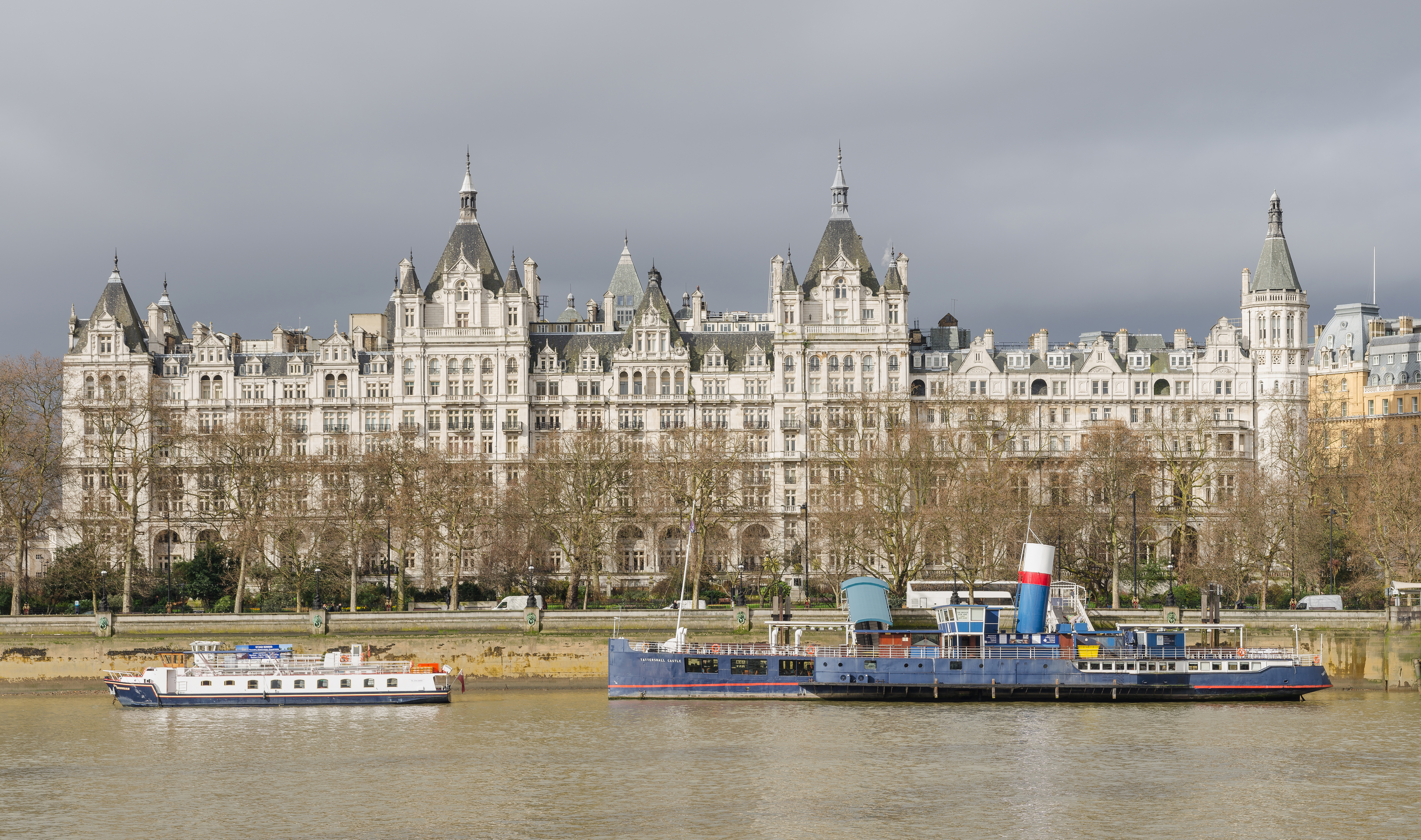
Whitehall Court, seen from South Bank. The National Liberal Club takes up the section on the right; the rest is mainly residential.

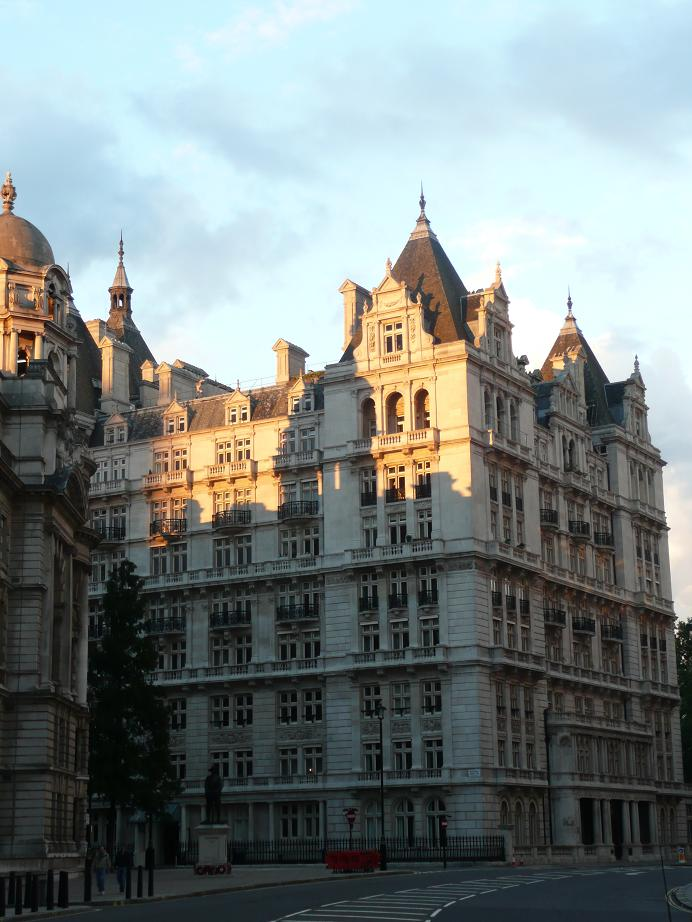
The southern half of Whitehall Court, encompassing numbers 3 and 4, photographed from inland.

Whitehall Court in the City of Westminster, England, is one contiguous building but consists of two separate constructions. The south end was designed by Thomas Archer and A. Green and constructed as a block of luxury residential apartments in 1884 while the north end, occupied by the National Liberal Club, was designed by Alfred Waterhouse and completed in 1887.

The building was developed speculatively by the Liberal MP and property developer Jabez Balfour, through the Liberator Building Society which he controlled. In 1892 the Society collapsed, leaving thousands of investors penniless. Instead of advancing money to home buyers, the Society had advanced money to property companies to buy properties owned by Balfour, at a high price.

Well-known residents have included William Gladstone, Lord Kitchener, Grand Duke Michael Alexandrovich of Russia, George Bernard Shaw and Hall Caine.

The building was used as Secret Intelligence Service (MI6) headquarters until the end of the First World War. A blue plaque in Mansfield Smith-Cumming's name at the SIS headquarters at 2 Whitehall Court was unveiled on 30 March 2015.

1 & 2 Whitehall Court are occupied by the Royal Horseguards Hotel. 3 Whitehall Court is occupied by the Farmers Club. 4 Whitehall Court was occupied by the West Indian Club from 1912 until 1971. It is currently split into apartments: in February 2018, Transparency International reported that lawyer and activist Alexei Navalny has claimed that Russian First Deputy Prime Minister Igor Shuvalov owns two apartments in Whitehall Court worth £11.4 million.

== Incidents ==
On 10 November 1969 David Rose, the Governor-General of Guyana was killed after luncheoning at the West Indian Club when some scaffolding fell on a car he was in.
