= Grosvenor Hotel =

Grosvenor Hotel may refer to:

- The Chester Grosvenor Hotel, Chester, England
- Grosvenor House Hotel, London, England
- The Clermont, Victoria, previously The Grosvenor Hotel.
