= Tower Hotel, London =

Hotel in London

Coordinates: 51°30′24″N 0°04′26″W

The Tower Hotel
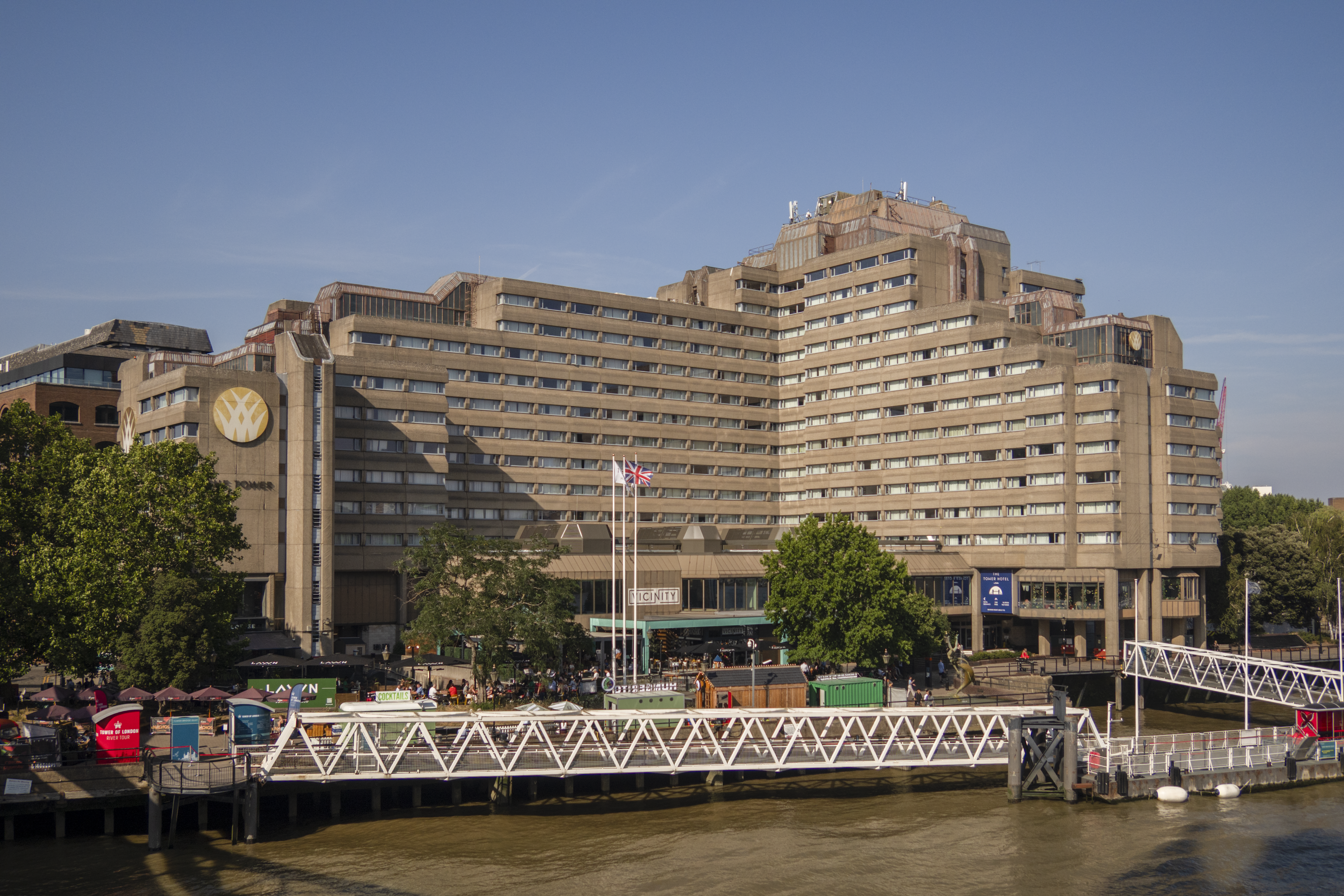
- The Tower Hotel, with Tower Bridge Quay in the foreground
- Interactive map of the The Tower Hotel area

General information
- Location: London, England
- Opening: 19 September 1973
- Operator: Clermont Hotel Group

Technical details
- Floor count: 14

Design and construction
- Architect: Renton Howard Wood Partnership
- Developer: Taylor Woodrow

Other information
- Number of rooms: 801
- Number of suites: 18
- Parking: 80 Spaces

Website
- The Tower Hotel

The Tower Hotel is a large hotel situated on the north bank of the River Thames in Wapping, on the east side of Tower Bridge, in London.

The hotel was designed by the Renton Howard Wood Partnership, constructed by Taylor Woodrow for owners J. Lyons & Co., and opened in September 1973 by the Constable of the Tower of London, Sir Richard Hull. It was built in a Brutalist style and was voted the second most hated building in London in a 2006 BBC poll.

J. Lyons operated the hotel until July 1977 when it was sold for £6.5m to EMI Leisure. In 1980, EMI Leisure properties, including the Tower Hotel, were sold to Trusthouse Forte. The hotel was later acquired by the Thistle Hotels group.

The hotel has 801 rooms, as well as 19 meeting rooms with capacity for up to 600 people. It also has a gym, restaurant, coffee bar, and licensed premises. The hotel is owned by Singapore-based GuocoLeisure which briefly shifted the hotel into a separate luxury brand called Guoman Hotels, later GLH Hotels and now Clermont Hotel Group.

It is frequently used for roof top filming due to its high level view of a skyline including Tower Bridge, Tower of London and the river.

The nearest London Underground station is Tower Hill. Tower Gateway DLR station is also nearby.

== See also ==
- Hotels in London
- Silver Jubilee Crystal Crown, mounted on the wall of the Tower Hotel
