= Henry Corbet =

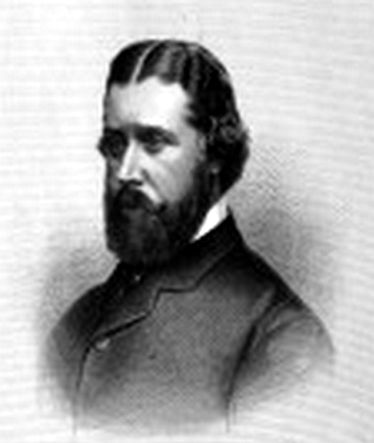
Portrait of Henry Corbet

Henry Corbet (31 December 1820 – 20 December 1878) was an English agricultural writer, and editor of the weekly The Mark Lane Express Agricultural Journal for twenty years. Together with John Morton he is considered one of "the leading agricultural editors during the most prosperous period of Victorian 'high farming' of the 1850s and 1860s."

== Biography ==
Born on the last day of 1820, educated at Bedford School, and prepared for university entrance, Corbet eventually became a London resident. He came to prominence when he was elected Secretary of the London Farmers Club in 1846.

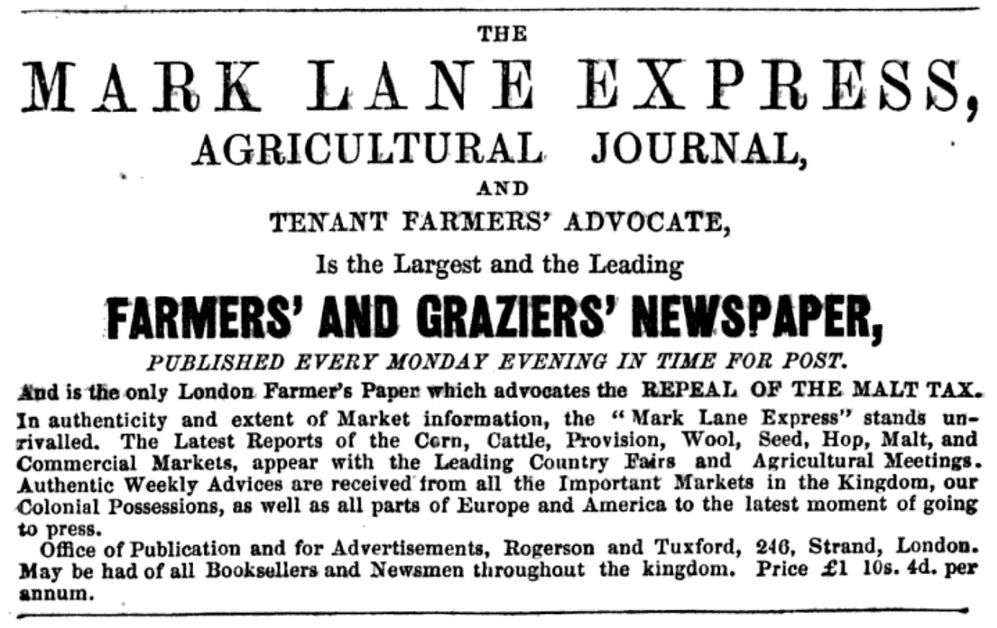
Mark Lane Express, advertisement 1855

Between 1846 and 1849, Corbet edited the Steeplechase Calendar and collaborated with William Shaw (editor of The Mark Lane Express since its foundation in 1832) and Philip Pusey in an investigation into tenant rights. This work provided Corbet with material which was awarded a prize by the Wenlock Farmers' Club in 1847. In 1848, with Shaw, he produced an extensive Digest of Evidence on the Agricultural Customs of England and Wales which, together with the prize essay of 1847, became a standard reference text on the subject.

Corbet also wrote for the Mark Lane Express and became its editor shortly after Shaw fled from England to Australia in 1852 to escape bankruptcy. Corbet spent the rest of his working life at the Mark Lane Express, retiring from its editorship, and the secretaryship of the London Farmers Club, in 1875 as his health failed.

In addition to his secretaryship of the London Farmers Club, Corbet was closely involved with the activities of the Total Repeal Malt-Tax Association. In the early 1860s, he helped to reform the affairs of the Royal Smithfield Club. In 1859, he was appointed auditor to the Royal Agricultural Society of England after it was discovered that the secretary, James Hudson, had embezzled £2,000 of the year's show receipts. Corbet also campaigned, with some success, against the over-exploitation of horses and, collaborating with his brother, Edward Corbet, in 1871 he established the Alexandra Park Horse Show.

Corbet gave a number of talks to the London Farmers Club which were published in its journal and elsewhere, and he contributed to a range of sporting publications such as The Field, Bell's Life in London, All the Year Round, and the New Sporting Magazine. Some of his writings were collected and published in 1864 as "Tales and Traits of Sporting Life".

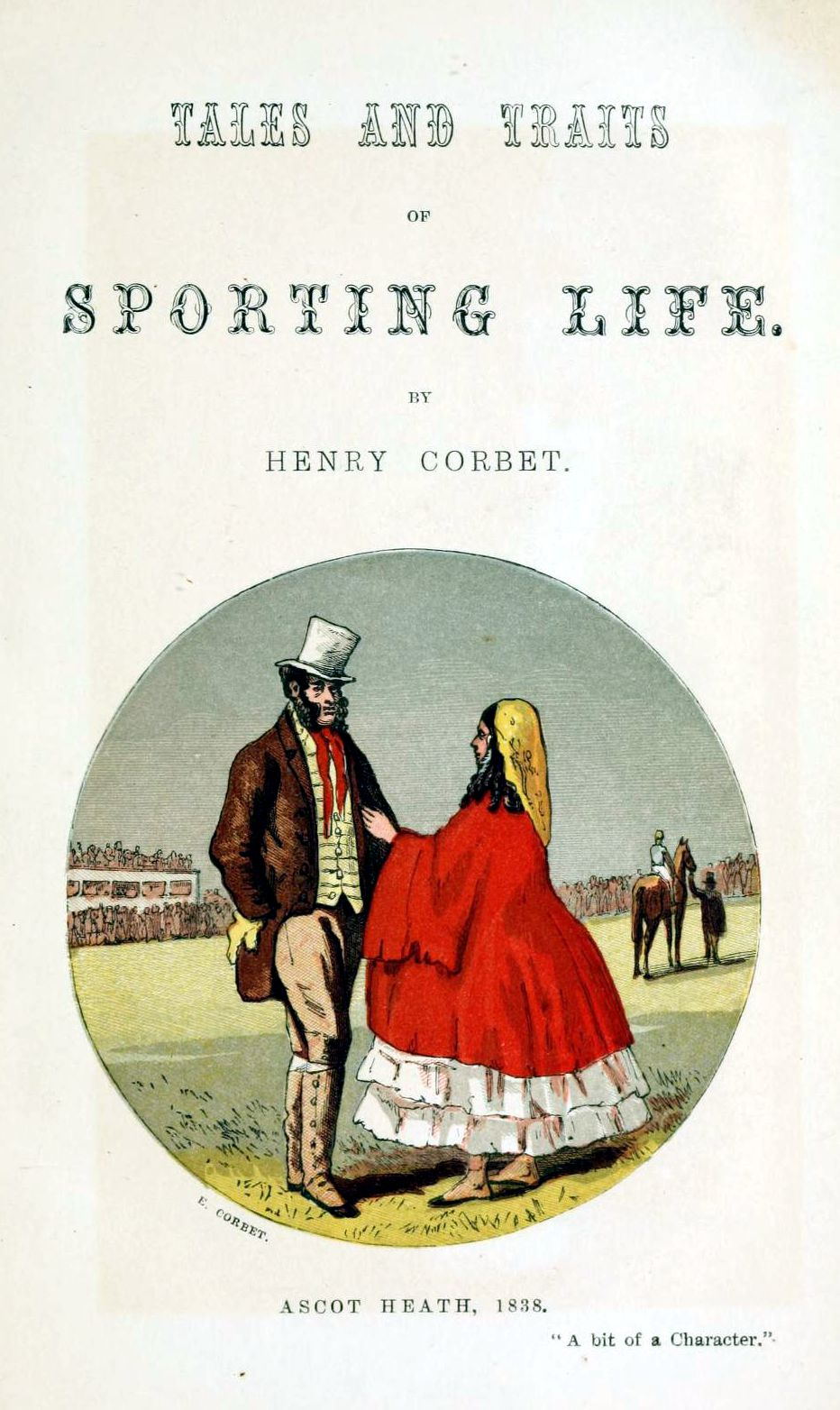
Tales and traits of sporting life, title page, 1864

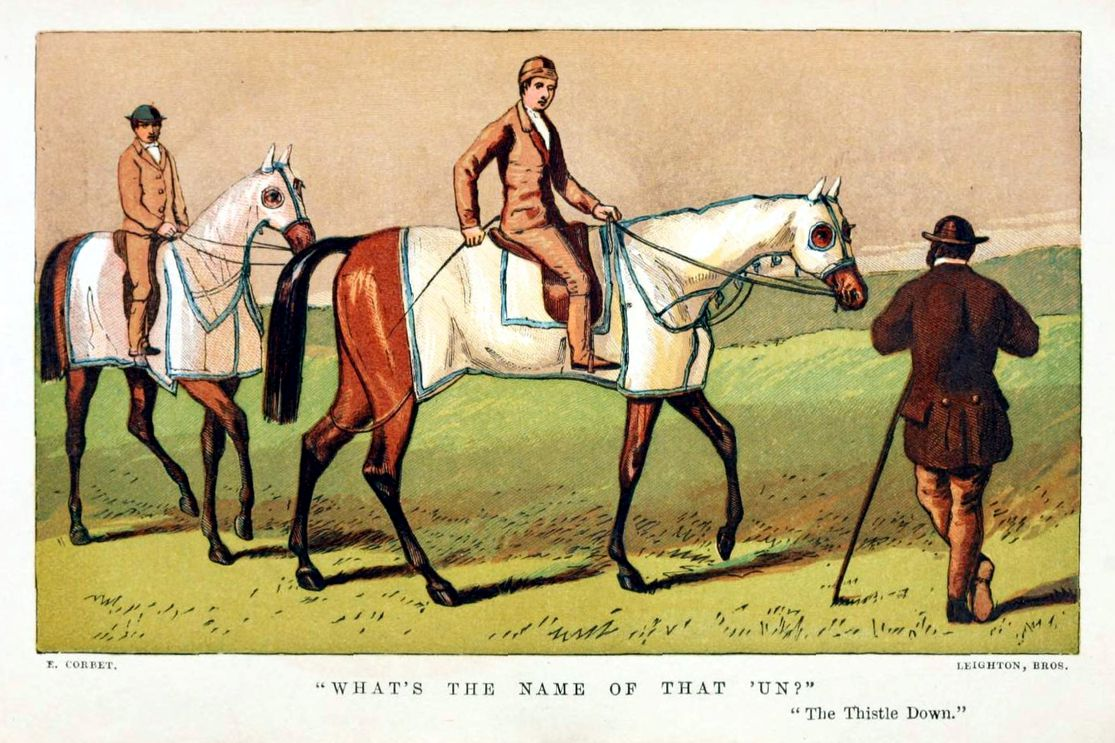
Tales and traits of sporting life, 1864

During the last three years of his life Corbet suffered from paralysis, and his health gradually declined. At the end of 1875 he was compelled to retire from active work, and it soon became apparent that recovery was hopeless. He died on Sunday 20 December 1879. A sketch of Corbet's life appeared in the Farmers Magazine for April 1878.

== Work ==
The period between 1840 and 1880 is often referred to as the period of high Victorian farming. Henry Corbet and John Morton were amongst the leading agricultural editors in Britain and, according to Goddard (1983) both Corbet and Morton were interested in agricultural progress. However, Corbet "was much more sceptical of the potentialities of some of the techniques and methods that were urged by the enthusiasts of the day: the use of sewage as a manure, for which much was claimed by Morton and others, but which proved to be virtually useless, is a case in point, so Corbet was much more interested in agricultural shows, cattle exhibitions, and country sport than was Morton, and wrote extensively for the New Sporting Magazine..."

=== Farmers Club ===
In 1846, Corbet was unanimously elected Secretary of the Farmers Club, overcoming stiff competition. The club, then only four years old, was in anything but a flourishing condition. However, better times lay ahead. The gentleman-tenant question was emerging, and Corbet wrote a prize essay on the subject during his first year in office – the judges were Lord Portman, Philip Pusey and William Shaw.

The essay was published in the spring of 1847 and, in the following year, at the request of Pusey, Corbet undertook, in conjunction with Snow, a digest of evidence on the Agricultural Customs of England and Wales – a work of immense labour.

=== Supplement to the Steeple-chase Calendar, 1845–46 ===
An 1846 review of the Supplement to the Steeple-chase Calendar by Henry Corbet states that "of the merits and demerits of steeple-chasing we will not now stop to inquire into, whether it be a "barbarous practice", "excessive cruelty to a poor dumb animal", or, on the other hand, if it be an "exhilarating sport", or a "healthy pastime." Sufficient be it presents to treat of the contents of the compendium now before us."

For years it had been a matter of serious complaint that the sport of steeple-chasing had no regulatory body, nor a reference work comparable to the Racing Calendar or the Yachtsman's Manual. A capital "start" was effected in the debut of the Steeple-Chase Calendar.

=== Work for newspapers and other periodicals ===
In 1853 Corbet was invited by the proprietors of The Mark Lane Express to write leaders and reports of agricultural meetings for that paper, and this gradually led to his undertaking the editorship. In addition to this, Corbet read papers at some of the local clubs, and contributed to the journals of agricultural societies. He was also a frequent contributor to the columns of The Field and Bell's Life, the sporting magazines, All the Year Round, and other periodicals.

=== Cattle Plague crisis of 1865–66 ===
During the cattle plague crisis of 1865–66 Corbet criticised the role of the Royal Agricultural Society of England, which had been unable to supply the decisive lead needed. In his 1866 address to the London Farmers' Club, entitled "The Cattle Plaque and the Government Measures", he reflected on their performance, stating:

The idea of a number of influential agriculturists gathered together to talk over cattle plague without, however, venturing to touch upon the means employed to subdue it is so sorry a joke that I do not believe after-years will ever credit its occurrence.

Goddard (1996) explained that, because "of widespread dissatisfaction with the inability of the Royal Agricultural Society of England to act on political issues in 1866, the Central Chamber of Agriculture was formed to give the political articulation to the agricultural interest that Corbet and others believed was needed. However, Corbet soon criticized the Central Chamber for being too dominated by landlords, and for thus failing to address the concerns of tenant farmers. With typical outspokeness he complained of the chamber's 'second-hand sayings and doings', its 'burlesque airs of importance', and its 'egregious system of puffing'..."

=== Work for other agricultural societies ===
For many years Corbet acted as a judge of riding horses at shows held in different parts of the country. Corbet was for some years an auditor to the Royal Agricultural Society, a member of the Council of the Royal Agricultural Benevolent Institution, and one of the committee of the French Farmers' Relief Fund, presided over by Lord Vernon. He was for some time secretary to, and afterwards on the committee of, the Total Repeal Malt-tax Association.

As a member of the Smithfield Club he proposed, at a general meeting of that Society, shortly before it moved to the Agricultural Hall, two resolutions, to the effect that the general members should have more voice, and the opportunity of taking more interest in the proceedings. Previously the business had been almost altogether in the hands of the stewards and judges. To the surprise of many his resolutions were both carried, and they led to the appointment of a council, in whose hands the whole business rested. At the request of the directors he drew the prize list of the first horse show held at Islington; and, in conjunction with his brother Edward he established the horse show at Alexandra Park.

== Selected publications ==
- O'Gorman, Henry Corbet. The Practice of Angling: Particularly as Regards Ireland. Vol. 2, 1845.
- Henry Corbet. The steeple-chase calendar, a chronicle of the sport in Great Britain ... Suppl. from Jan. 1845 to the close of 1846. 1846.
- William Shaw and Henry Corbet. Digest of evidence taken before a committee of the House of Commons appointed to inquire into the agricultural customs of England and Wales in respect to tenant-right. 1849
- Henry Corbet. The over-preservation of game, a paper. 1860.
- Henry Corbet. Tales and traits of sporting life 1864

Papers in The Proceedings of the Farmers Club, a selection:

- 1860. "The Over-preservation of Game."
- 1862, "County Expenditure and County Bates." read in 1862 — on the
- 1863. "Operation of the Malt-tax."
- 1866. "The Cattle Plaque and the Government Measures"
- 1869. "Foxes versus Rabbits in 1869;
- 1870. "English Tenant-Right", history of and exposition of
- 1877. "The use and Abuse of Fashion in Breeding Stock."
