= Crystal Crown =

Crystal Crown may refer to:

- Shenyang Olympic Sports Center Stadium
- Silver Jubilee Crystal Crown
