= Mark Lane Express =

London agriculture journal published from 1832

- Format: Tabloid
- Founded: 1832
- Ceased publication: 1924
- Language: English
- City: London
- Country: UK

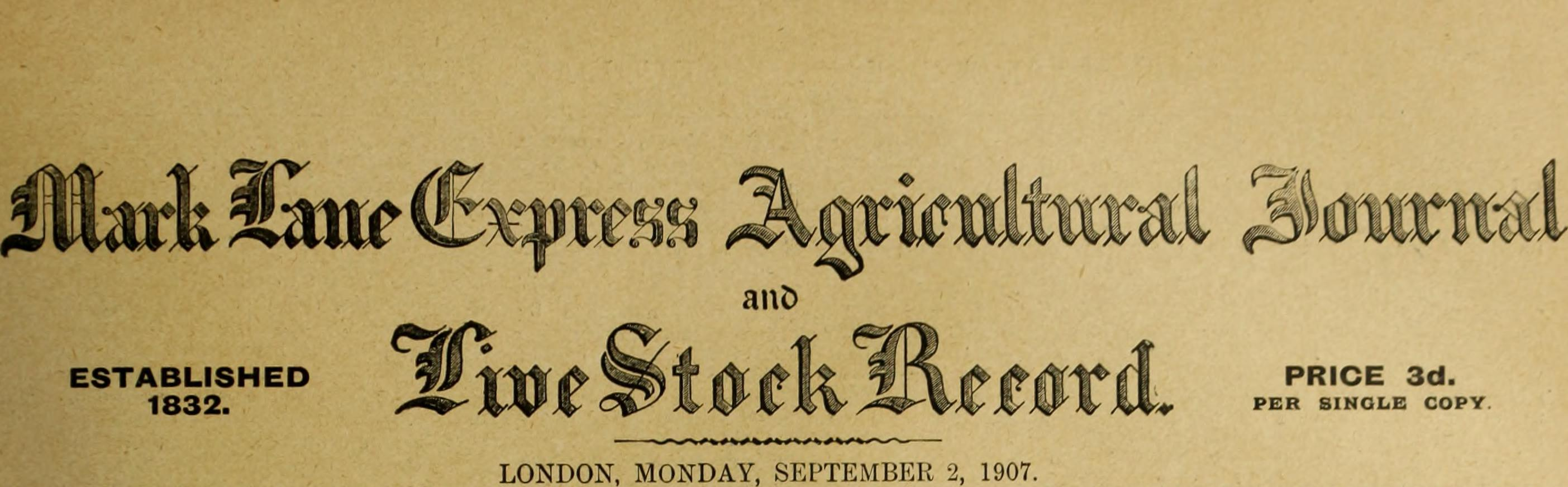
The Mark Lane Express masthead, 1907.

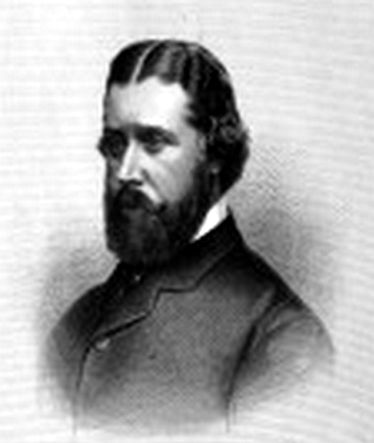
Henry Corbet, the second editor of the Mark Lane Express.

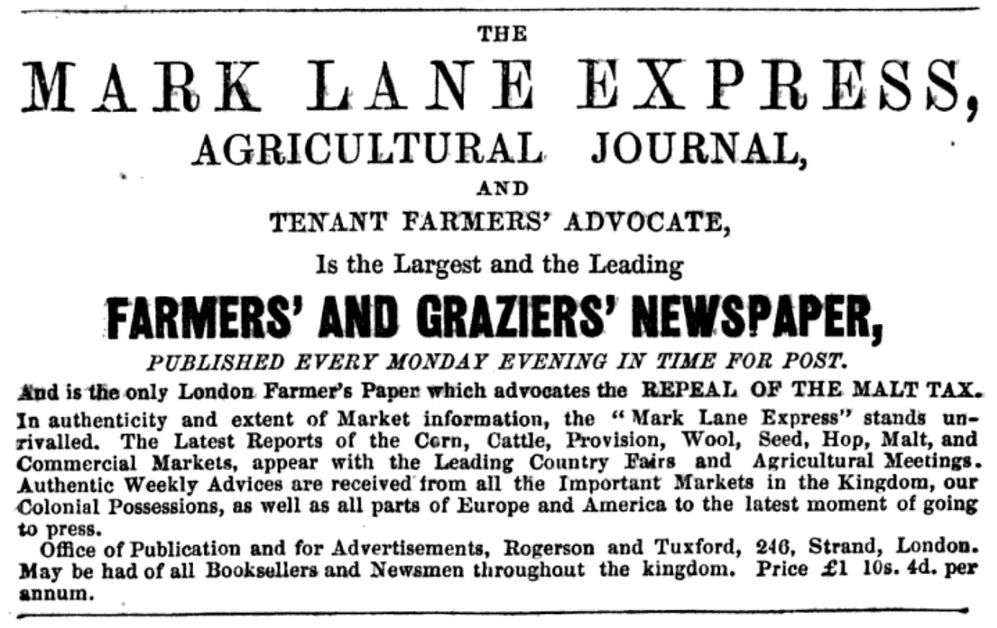
An 1855 advertisement for the publication.

Mark Lane Express was a London-based agriculture journal founded in 1832. It was published weekly by Isaac Alger. William Shaw was the first editor. He was followed by Henry Corbet who was the editor from 1853 to 1875. Later editors include Alexander Macdonald, William Edwin Bear (1840-1918), Albert Joseph Stanton (1841-1901), Julius Beerbohm (1810-1892) and Henry Francis Moore.

The owners, at various times, included George Parker Tuxford, John and Joseph Rogerson, Cuthbert William Johnson and William A. May.

By 1851, the publication had an engraving of the London Corn Exchange in its masthead. The exchange was located in Mark Lane. The term “Mark Lane” was used at the time as a metonym for the grain market.

The publication,

… was begun [more] as a trade organ than anything else, the object in view being that of supplying subscribers with an accurate account of the state of trade at the Monday market at Mark Lane, together with the prices of corn and seed sold, and also similar reports of the Smithfield and Newgate cattle and dead meat market.

But as time went on its scope increased, together with the number of pages it contained.

Each issue provided detailed and up-to-date information on market prices for agricultural produce and livestock. It might also feature articles on best farming practices, plant and animal diseases and their treatments, fertilisers, new machinery and rural organisations. It sometimes discussed proposed legislation likely to effect farmers, freight rates for agricultural products and many other subjects of interest to those on the land.

It championed the interests of tenant farmers and tenant rights.

Contributors to its pages included John Bennet Lawes, Alfred Russel Wallace, Cuthbert W. Johnson and Henry Steel Olcott who was the American correspondent for the publication (1858–60).

Weekly sales were around 3,750 in the late 1830s. Average circulation per week in 1859 was 169,000. This figure had grown to 222,000 by 1868. As well as Britain, there were subscribers in America, Canada, Australia, New Zealand and South Africa.

It absorbed The Farmers and Gardeners Journal in 1880.

By 1888, the publication was spoken of as, “the leading British authority on agriculture and stock-breeding.” Its status meant its articles and statistics were often reprinted or quoted in other newspapers and periodicals.

In the 1890s, the Express issued an annual almanac for the forthcoming year. This featured useful information for farmers, such as the best planting dates for various crops.

The Mark Lane Express continued to be produced, although under two slightly different titles, till 1924. In that year it was absorbed into the Farmers Express (1924-1929).
