= Farmers Club =

London gentlemen's club

Coordinates: 51°30′25.5″N 0°7′37.9″W

The Farmers Club
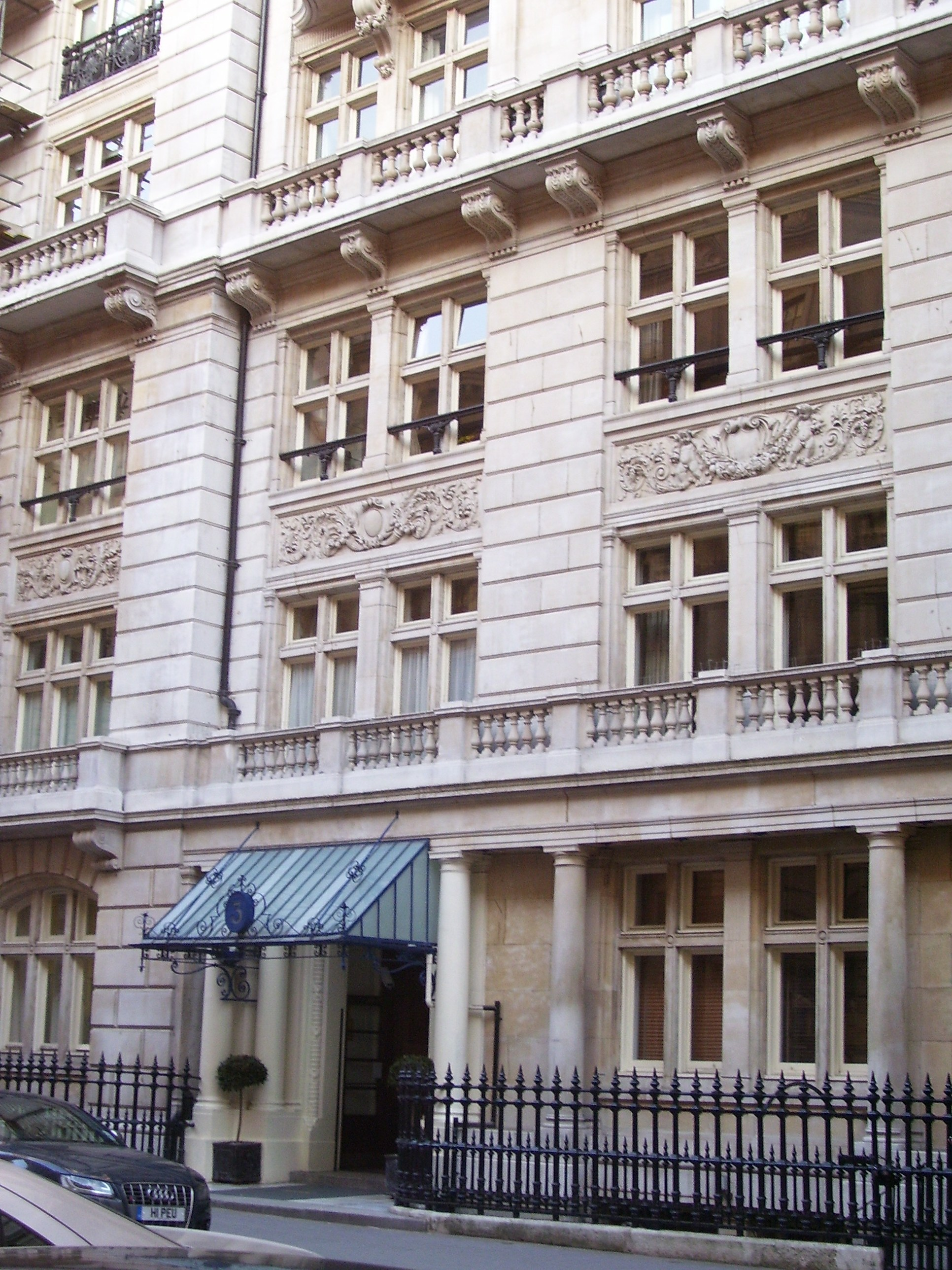
- Front of the clubhouse in 2009
- Founded: 1842; 184 years ago
- Type: Private members' club
- Purpose: Club established for farmers
- Location: 3 Whitehall Court, London, UK (since 1942)
- Website: thefarmersclub.com

The Farmers Club is a private members' club that was founded in 1842. It is located at 3 Whitehall Court in the Whitehall district of London, England. Members are required to have an association with farming, agriculture or food.

== History ==
The club was founded in 1842 by the agricultural writer William Shaw, who invited the founding members from the newly formed Royal Agricultural Society of England, and the Smithfield Club. Shaw's letter set out that the club would be "a gathering place for farmers which could also serve as a platform, from which would go out to England news of all that was good in farming, with reports of any discussions about those things that needed to be done."

The club's membership experienced periodic shifts with the changing prosperity of British farmers over the years – there were 700 members in 1876, 275 in 1892, but the club grew in the 20th century, claiming 1,500 members in the 1920s, and just under 6,000 today.

The club frequently moved premises in its first 60 years. Its inaugural meeting on 9 December 1842 was held in a pub, the Hereford Arms, in King Street, Covent Garden. By April 1893 the club has secured rooms at the York Hotel in Bridge Street, Blackfriars. After several further moves, the club settled on some rooms at 2 Whitehall Court, which it occupied between 1904 and 1942. Whitehall Court is an apartment block built in 1883-87 by the architect firm Archer & Green, with finance from the disgraced MP Jabez Balfour, who used the building's construction to conceal his embezzlement of funds.

In 1942, it moved sideways in the same block of flats to its current premises, which were formed by merging several apartments in 3 Whitehall Court. The rest of the block remains largely residential, and the club's former rooms now make up part of the Royal Horseguards Hotel, owned by Thistle Hotels.

The Club comprises bedrooms, function rooms, the Restaurant, Bar and Lounge and has a terrace overlooking the river Thames.

== See also ==
- List of members' clubs in London
