= Topland Group =

Property company of the United Kingdom

Topland Group PLC
- Type: Private
- Founded: 28 May 1991; 35 years ago in London, England
- Founder: Sol Zakay; Eddie Zakay
- Headquarters: London, England
- Website: topland.co.uk

Topland Group PLC is a British property and investment company. In 2014, Topland was described as one of the world's largest privately owned property and investment groups.

The company head office is at 105 Wigmore Street, London.

== History ==
Topland Group is one of the world's largest privately owned property and investment groups. The company owns property in the UK and in 2013 bought 12 out of the 15 hotels (all in the UK) owned by the bankrupt Menzies Hotels for about $135 million. They own a number of other UK hotels, including Bath's Royal Crescent Hotel, the Hilton Brighton Metropole, the Glasgow Hilton and several Thistle Hotels, six in central London and one in Edinburgh.

Between 2000 and 2020, Topland amalgamated and sold a number of large retail and supermarket portfolios through sale & leaseback transactions; these include a £500m Marks & Spencer portfolio, a £950m Tesco Supermarket portfolio, and a £300m deal with Spanish retailer Eroski.

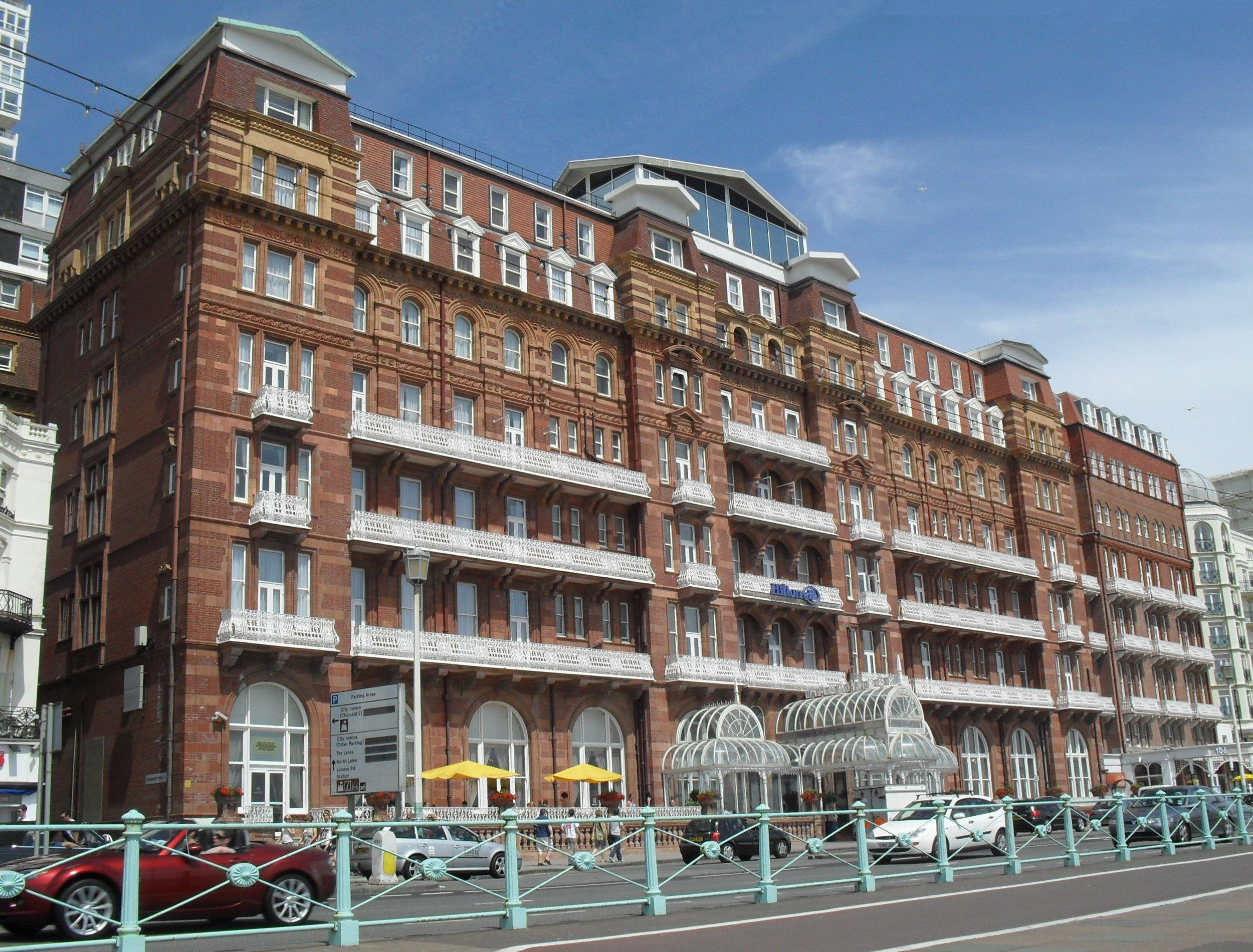
The Hilton Brighton Metropole

According to The Sunday Times Rich List in 2023 the founders' net worth was approximately £3.5 billion.

In 2012, The Guardian reported that Topland was being sued by the UK's Ministry of Justice, having "conspired with a property agent in 2002 to extract inflated rents from the government on one of its central London buildings which houses the main London divorce courts". The UK government has accused Topland of "deceit, fraud by bribery, dishonest assistance and breach of confidence". The case was "settled out of court on confidential terms".

Although Topland has diversified into natural resources and renewable energy, its principal activity remains commercial real estate, with a portfolio of over 220 properties, valued in the region of £3.5 billion. In 2019, Topland sold the 26 property Hallmark Hotels portfolio for £250m. Topland also has a hotel portfolio consisting of 40 hotels which includes the Royal Crescent Hotel, in the Royal Crescent in Bath, the Hilton Brighton Metropole, the Glasgow Hilton and several Thistle Hotels, six in central London, and one in Edinburgh.

In January 2022, Topland purchased several sites and assembled a development pipeline of £850m. In July 2022 Topland began the development of a £165m sustainable office scheme in the City of London, which they subsequently pre-let to TikTok. In 2023, Topland agreed to a £160m forward funding with Blackstone-owned iQ Student Accommodation for a student housing and co-living campus next to the University of Warwick.

== Philanthropy ==
From 2009, Topland hosted an annual charity business lunch in conjunction with Jewish Care. In 2024, it was held at the Grosvenor House Hotel in London, at which 1000 people attended and £440,000 was raised for the charity's causes.
