= Royal Horseguards Hotel =

Hotel in London, England

The Royal Horseguards Hotel
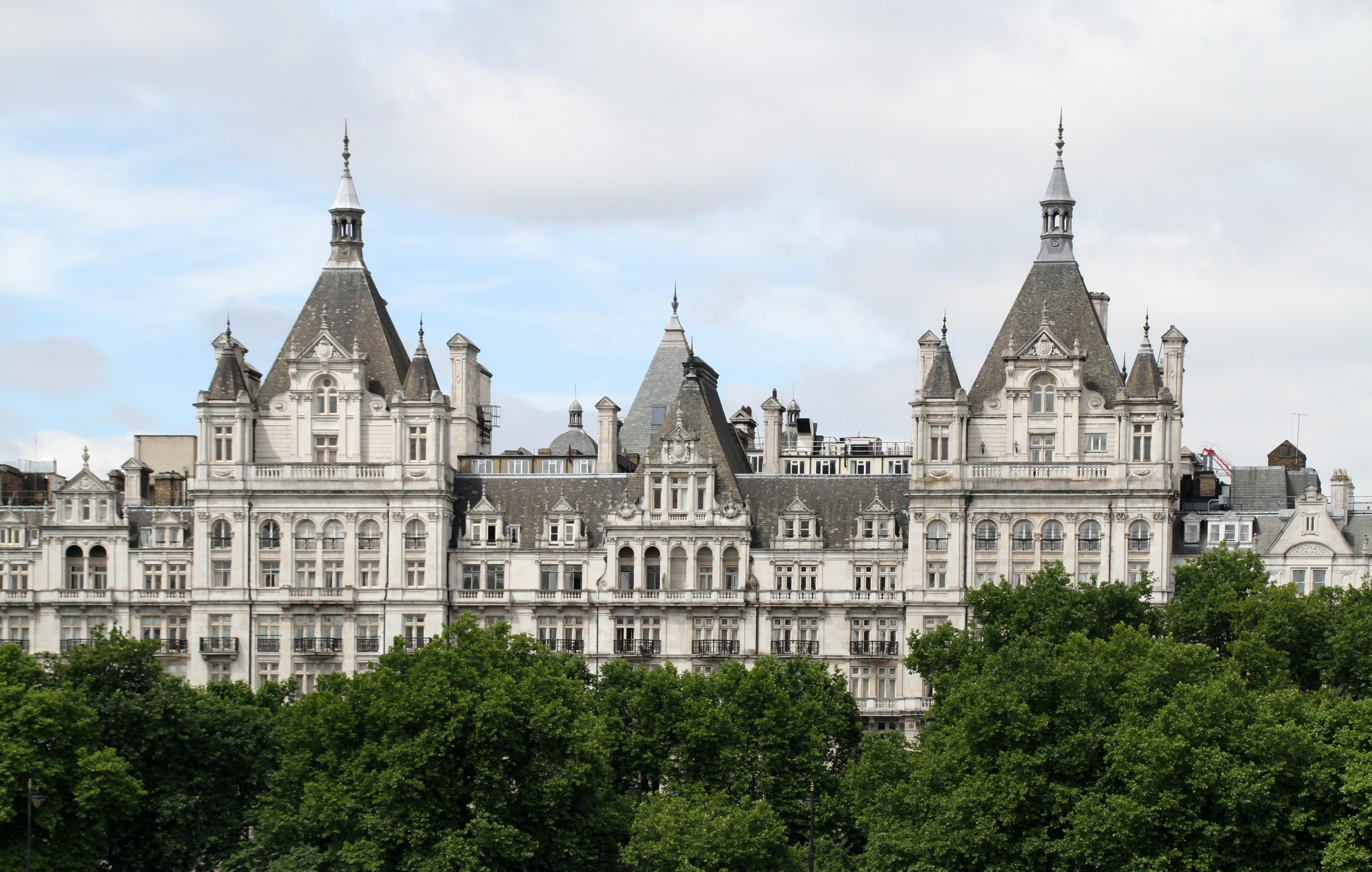
- View of Whitehall Court
- Interactive map of the The Royal Horseguards Hotel area

General information
- Location: 2 Whitehall Court; London SW1A 2EJ
- Coordinates: 51.5055°N 0.1244°W
- Opened: 1884: building erected 1971: converted to hotel 2008: became a Guoman hotel
- Management: Clermont Hotel Group

Technical details
- Floor count: 9

Other information
- Number of rooms: 282
- Number of restaurants: 2

Website
- royalhorseguardshotel.com

The Royal Horseguards Hotel is a luxury hotel that is located at 2 Whitehall Court in the Whitehall district of London, England. It is operated by the Clermont Hotel Group, a subsidiary of GL Limited of Singapore.

== History ==
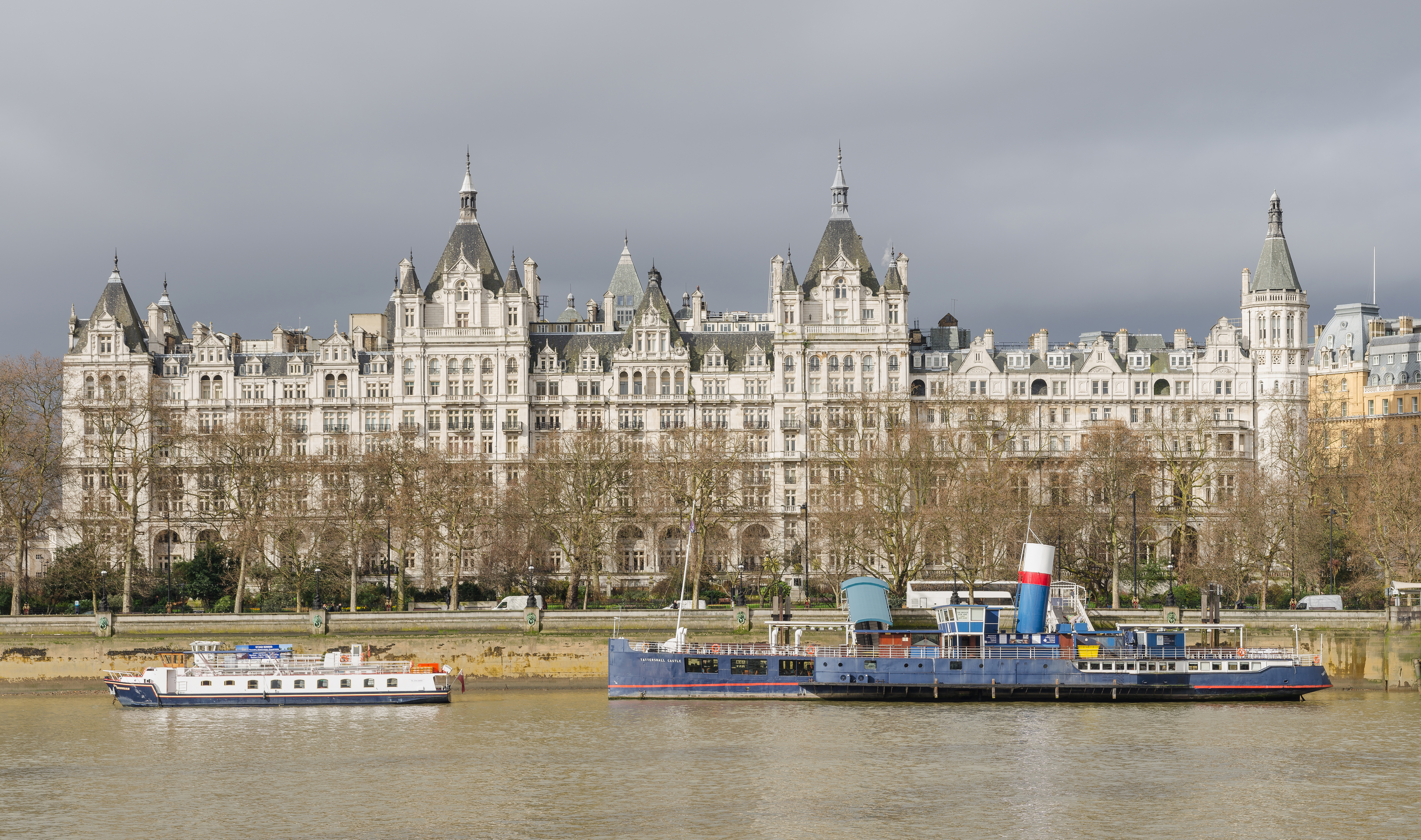
Whitehall Court, as seen from the South Bank of the Thames

The building is the centre section of Whitehall Court, which was designed by Thomas Archer and A. Green. It was constructed as a block of luxury residential apartments in 1884. The building's construction was the centrepiece of an elaborate pyramid scheme for fraud by the Liberal MP and property developer Jabez Balfour, through the Liberator Building Society which he controlled. In 1892 the Society collapsed, leaving thousands of investors penniless. Instead of advancing money to home buyers, the Society had advanced money to property companies to buy properties owned by Balfour, at a high price. It achieved its listed building status due to its architecture, which is modelled on a French chateau.

The centre section of the building, 1-2 Whitehall Court, was converted to a hotel in 1971. The hotel expanded in 1985, when it acquired the 140 bedrooms above the adjoining National Liberal Club) at One Whitehall Place. The hotel was acquired by Guoman Hotels in 2008. It underwent a £20 million refurbishment at that time.

== Media appearances ==
The World Branding Awards was held at One Whitehall Place, the events building of the Royal Horseguards Hotel, in 2014.

== Location ==
The hotel is in Central London, just off the Embankment and Whitehall and near Trafalgar Square. The nearest tube station is Embankment and the nearest railway station is Charing Cross.
