= RHWL =

Former construction firm

RHWL Architects

Practice information
- Founded: 1961
- Location: London

Significant works and honors
- Buildings: Crucible Theatre

RHWL Architects (originally Renton Howard Wood Associates) was a British architecture practice based in London, Berlin and Qatar. It was created by Andrew Renton, Peter Howard and Humphrey Wood following the establishment of Andrew Renton & Associates in 1961. Gerald Levin became a Name Partner in 1973, and from that date the Firm was often known as 'RHWL'. It was well known for projects undertaken in the fields of residential and commercial buildings, further education and the entertainment industry. RHWL Architects, Arts Team and RHWL Interiors eventually became part of Renton Howard Wood Levin LLP, a limited liability partnership. RHWL and Arts Team were acquired by Aedas on 26 January 2015.

== Notable buildings ==
In order of opening date:

=== Arts & culture ===
- Crucible Theatre, Sheffield, 1971
- Administration Building, University of Warwick, 1973
- Chaplaincy Centre, University of Warwick, 1973
- Arts Centre, University of Warwick, 1974
- Bridge House, Southwark, 1976
- Tolmers Square Housing, Euston, 1977
- Nottingham Theatre Royal, 1977
- Nottingham Royal Concert Hall, 1982
- Derngate Theatre, Northampton, 1983
- Old Vic Theatre, London, 1983
- Regent Theatre, Ipswich,1991
- Bridgewater Hall, Manchester, 1996
- Sadler's Wells Theatre, London, 1998
- Coliseum Theatre restoration, London, 2004
- Aylesbury Waterside Theatre, 2010
- Bord Gais Energy Theatre, Grand Canal Square, Dublin, 2010
- Milton Court Concert Hall, City of London, 2013, Theatre and Studio Theatre for The Guildhall School of Music and Drama.

=== Hotels ===
- Tower Hotel, 1972
- St Pancras Chambers refurbishment and extension, London, 2011 (with Richard Griffiths Architects)

== Awards and commendations ==
15 RIBA, 14 Civic Trust, 3 RICS, 1 USITT, 1 Europa Nostra

- Europa Nostra Commendation London Coliseum
