= Cuthbert William Johnson =

English barrister and writer (1799–1878)

Cuthbert William Johnson (21 September 1799 – 8 March 1878) was an English barrister and agricultural writer.

== Life ==
Born at Bromley, Kent, on 21 September 1799, he was the eldest surviving son of William Johnson of Liverpool, and of Widmore House, Bromley, Kent. George William Johnson was his brother, and they were for some time employed together in their father's salt-works at Heybridge, Maldon, Essex.

With his brother, Johnson was admitted a member of Gray's Inn on 6 January 1832, and called to the bar on 8 June 1836. He had chambers at 14 Gray's Inn Square, went the western circuit, and attended the Winchester and Hampshire sessions.

He was a co-founder of the agriculture journal The Mark Lane Express in 1832. He was also a contributor to that publication.

Johnson was widely known as an authority on agricultural matters. He took part in the agitation which led to the passing of the Public Health Act 1848, and was for many years chairman of the Croydon local board of health. He was elected Fellow of the Royal Society on 10 March 1842. He died at his house, Waldronhurst, Croydon, on 8 March 1878.

== Works ==
Johnson wrote works with his brother. Major works on his own, all published in London, were:

- The Use of Crushed Bones as Manure, 1836; 3rd edit. the same year.
- The Life of Sir Edward Coke, 2 vols. 1837.
- The Advantages of Railways to Agriculture, with Observations on the General Importance of Railways by George William Johnson, 1837; 2nd edit. the same year.
- The Law of Bills of Exchange, Promissory Notes, Checks, &c., 2nd edit. 1839.
- On Fertilisers, 1839; 3rd edit. 1851.
- The Farmers' Encyclopædia and Dictionary of Rural Affairs, 1842; edited for American use by Gouverneur Emerson.
- Agricultural Chemistry for Young Farmers, 1843.
- The Farmer's Medical Dictionary for the Diseases of Animals, 1845.
- The Acts for Promoting the Public Health, 1848–51, 1852.

With Edward Cresy, Johnson wrote On the Cottages of Agricultural Labourers, 1847. From 1840 he ran The Farmer's Almanac and Calendar with William Shaw; from 1843 he worked with other writers to bring out The Annual Register of Agricultural Instruction. He translated in 1844 Albrecht Thaer's Principles of Agriculture from the German.

== Family ==
Johnson married Mary Ann Gower, eldest daughter of Richard Hall Gower, in 1844. She died in 1861.

== Notes ==
Attribution

This article incorporates text from a publication now in the public domain: Lee, Sidney, ed. (1892). "Johnson, Cuthbert William". Dictionary of National Biography. Vol. 30. London: Smith, Elder & Co.
