= GL Limited =

Singapore-based investment holding company

- Formerly: GuocoLeisure; Brierley Investments
- Traded as: SGX: B16
- Industry: Investments
- Founded: 1961
- Founder: Ron Brierley
- Headquarters: Singapore
- Parent: Guoco Group
- Subsidiaries: See below
- Website: www.gl-grp.com

GL Limited is an investment company listed on the Singapore Exchange. Founded as Brierley Investments in 1961, it was formerly listed on the Australian, London and New Zealand exchanges.

== History ==
Brierley Investments was founded by Ron Brierley in 1961 and in 1985 listed on stock exchanges in Australia, England and New Zealand. It grew to become one of the biggest – and for a time most successful and glamorous – companies in the 1980s. At its peak about 150,000 New Zealanders were Brierley Investments shareholders.

In the 1980s Brierley Investments was a feared corporate raider in Australia and Britain, but the firm stumbled after the 1987 sharemarket crash, and Brierley was eventually deposed in a boardroom coup. In the 1990s the firm's investments were poor, it mismanaged its foreign-exchange risk, and its balance sheet suffered. In 1999 the firm moved its head office to Singapore and listed on the Singapore Exchange. In July 2002, BI was delisted from the Australian Securities Exchange.

In 2003, Brierley Investments was acquired by the Guoco Group and rebranded GuocoLeisure in November 2007. Due to a low volume of trading, GuocoLeisure's board decided to delist from the New Zealand Exchange in June 2014.

== Investments ==
- Air New Zealand (35%)
- Fairfax Media (25%)
- Clermont Hotel Group
- Guinness Peat Group
- Industrial Equity Limited
- James Hardie (29%)
- Thistle Hotels (46%)
- Union Company (100%)
