= William Shaw (agricultural writer) =

British agricultural writer, editor and translator

- Born: 1797; Bath, Somerset, England
- Died: 1853 (aged 55–56)
- Education: Wadham College, Oxford
- Occupation: agricultural writer
- Known for: helped establish the Royal Agricultural Society of England
- Notable work: The Farmer's Almanac and Calendar

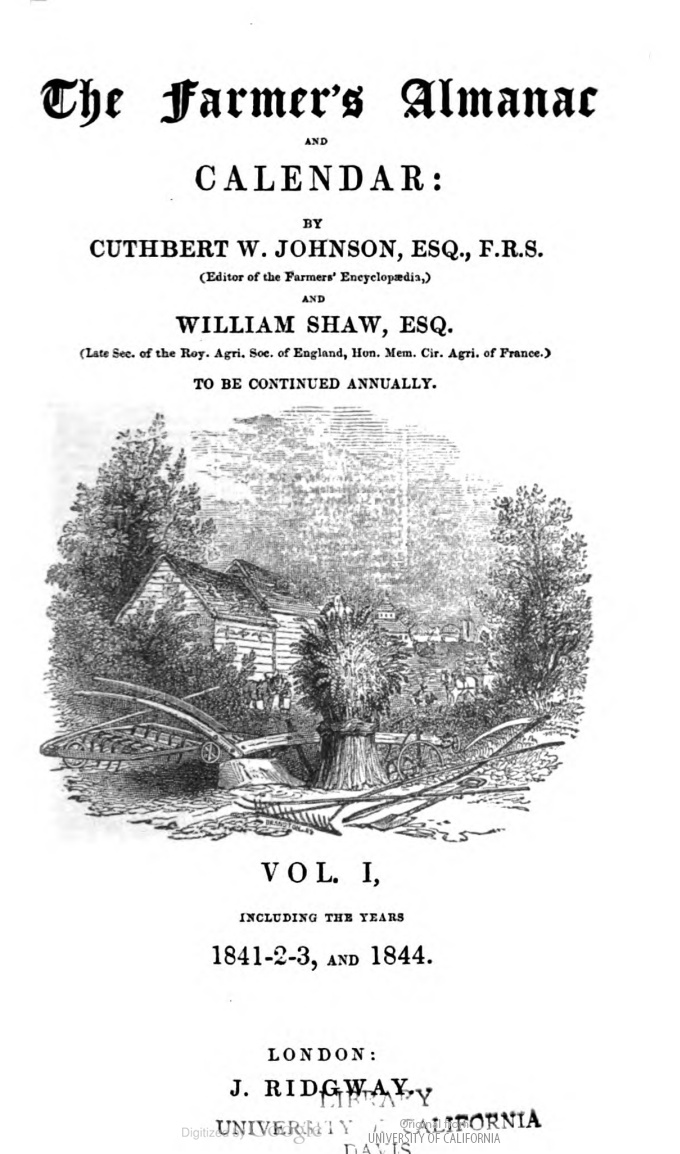
The Farmer's Almanac and Calendar by Cuthbert W. Johnson and William Shaw, 1841

William Shaw "of the strand" (1797–1853) was a British agricultural writer, editor and translator, first editor of the agricultural journal Mark Lane Express, and of The Farmer's almanac and calendar, and co-founder of the Farmers Club in 1842. He is known for advocating agricultural reforms and improvements.

== Life and work ==
William Shaw was born in Bath, Somerset in 1797, as eldest son of John Shaw of Bath. He spent two years from June 1813 to June 1815 at Wadham College, Oxford, and was admitted to the Inner Temple on 20 June 1828, being called to the bar on 22 November 1833.

In 1832 Shaw co-founded the weekly agricultural journal The Mark Lane Express of which he became its first editor. The other co-founders were Cuthbert William Johnson (1799–1878), John Rogerson and Joseph Rogerson, farmers from Lincolnshire, Doctor J. Blackstone, and George Parker Tuxford. In his position as editor Shaw played a leading role in advocating innovative farming techniques and the formation of agricultural societies and farmer's clubs in Britain.

Shaw further came into public prominence in connection with his efforts towards the establishment of the Royal Agricultural Society. He took a leading part in the preliminary work of forming this society, and at the inaugural meeting held on 9 May 1838. He was chosen the first secretary, a position which he resigned in the following year, when he was elected 7 August 1839 a member of the council. Shaw was also elected honorary member of the French Académie d'Agriculture.

In 1838 he had started with his lifelong friend, Cuthbert William Johnson. In 1841 they started as the first editors of The Farmer's almanac and calendar. This publication had an annual sale of about 15,000 between 1841 and 1865, and was according to Goddard (1983), "probably among the most widely read of all agricultural publications of the nineteenth century." The Farmers' Almanack and Calendar continued to be issued annually in their joint names, notwithstanding Shaw's death in 1853, until 1872. Shaw was a great supporter of farmers' clubs, and a frequent speaker and reader of papers at them. The establishment of the London Farmers Club in 1842 was greatly owing to his efforts, and he was honorary secretary from 1840 to 1843. Other founders of the Farmers Club were James Allen Ransome, Robert Baker, and one or two others. In 1844 Shaw and Johnson translated and brought out an English edition of Von Thaer's Principles of Agriculture.

Between 1846 and 1849, Shaw edited the Steeplechase Calendar and collaborated with Henry Corbet, editor of the Mark Lane Express since its foundation in 1832, and Philip Pusey in an investigation into tenant rights. He read before this body six papers on tenant right and two on agricultural statistics. He took up enthusiastically the then novel but soon burning question of tenant right. In 1848 with Corbet he published an extensive Digest of Evidence on the Agricultural Customs of England and Wales. This was a digest of the evidence on tenant right given in the previous year before the famous committee of the House of Commons presided over by Philip Pusey. This digest was very popular, and is still useful for reference; a second edition appeared in 1854.

In 1849 he participated in the North Hampshire by-election as tenant farmer. On 1 April 1850 Shaw was presented with a service of silver plate by the tenant farmers for his advocacy of their cause, when he was described by the chairman who made the presentation as "the Cobden of Agriculture." He was one of the chief founders of the Farmers' Insurance Company established in 1840, and amalgamated in 1888 with the Alliance Insurance Company, of which he was managing director. He was managing director also of a less successful venture, the Farmers' and Graziers' Mutual Cattle Insurance Association, established 1844, which fell into difficulties in 1849.

Other ventures of Shaw's proved unsuccessful, and during the time of the railway mania he had money troubles. In November 1852 he fled to Australia to escape bankruptcy, where, some time in 1853, he died very miserably in the gold diggings far up the country, with only a few pence in his pocket. He was married, but lived apart from his wife. Shaw was of commanding presence and had fine features. There is a small portrait of him by Richard Ansdell (1842) in the rooms of the Royal Agricultural Society at 13 Hanover Square. This was reproduced in the engraving of the society subsequently published in 1843. Back in London Henry Corbet succeeded Shaw, both as editor of The Farmer's almanac and calendar, and as secretary of the Farmers Club.

== Selected publications ==
- Cuthbert W. Johnson and William Shaw. The Farmer's almanac and calendar. 1841–50 (online)
- Albert D. Thaër. Tr. by William Shaw and Cuthbert W. Johnson. The principles of agriculture. London, Ridgway, 1844.
- William Shaw. To the Right Honorable the Lords Spiritual and Temporal, and to the members of the House of Commons by William Shaw. 1847.
- William Shaw and Henry Corbet. Digest of evidence taken before a committee of the House of Commons appointed to inquire into the agricultural customs of England and Wales in respect to tenant-right. 1849
