= Square d'Orléans =

Square of Paris, France

Coordinates: 48.8774°N 2.3360°E

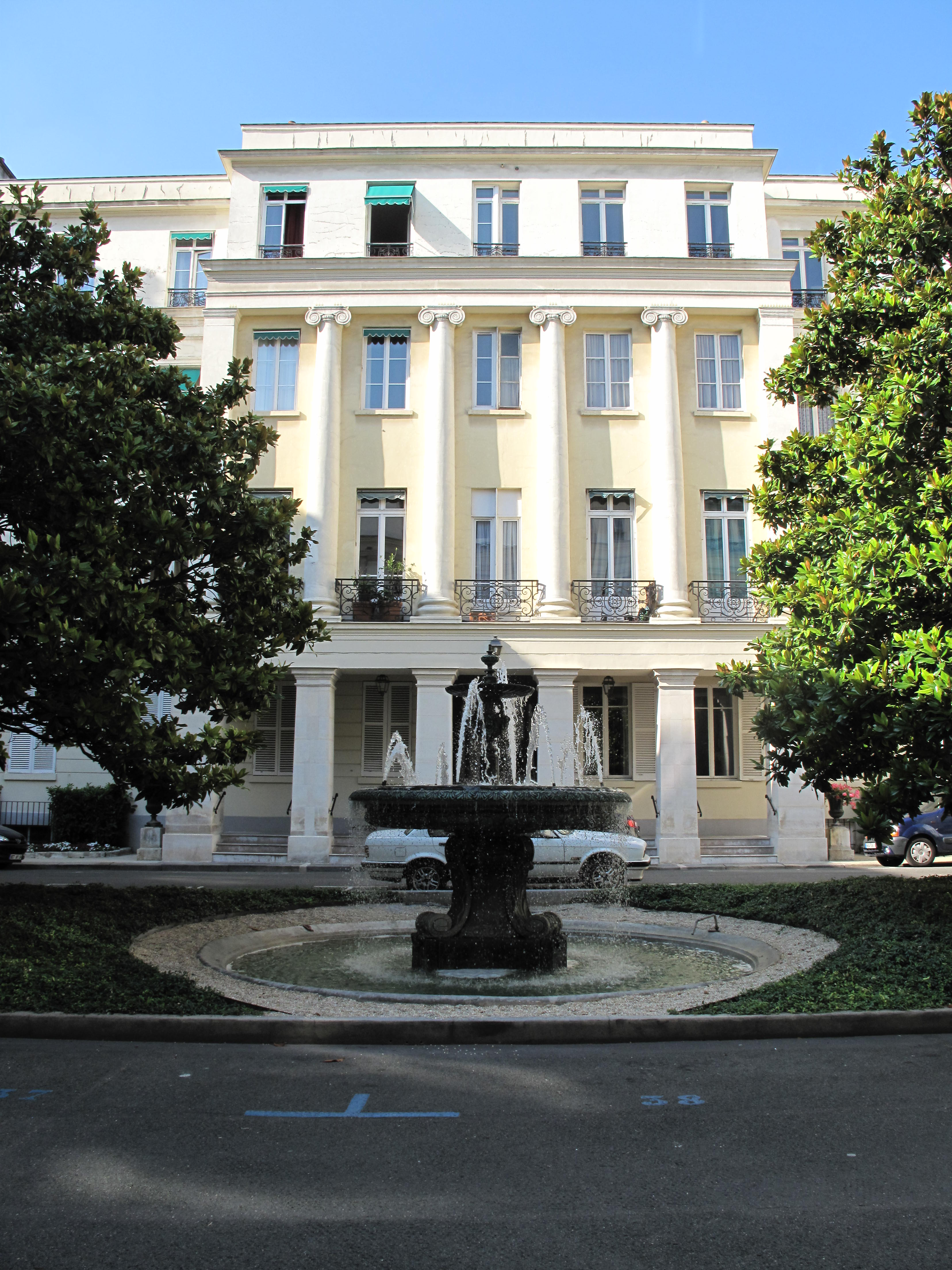
The Square d'Orléans

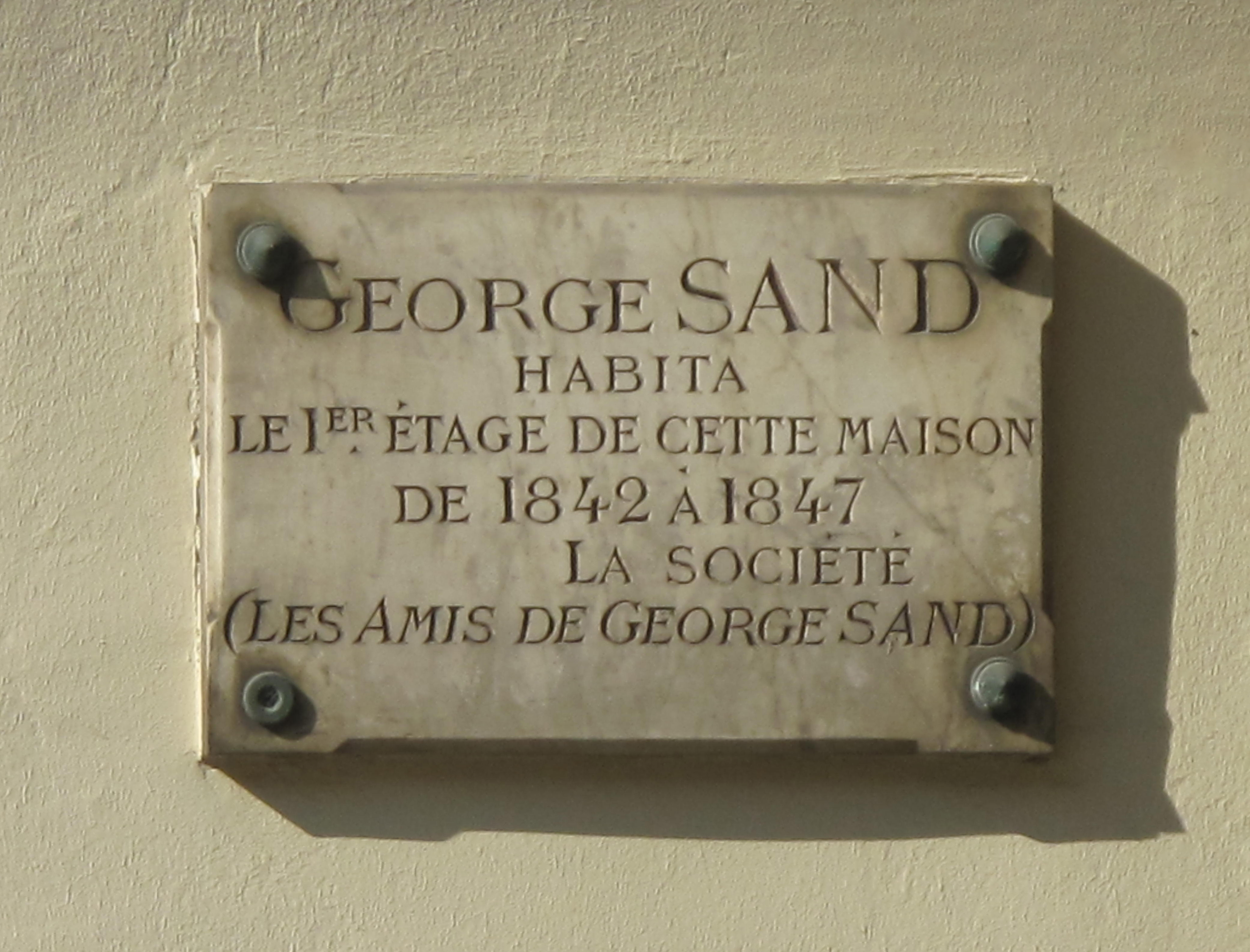
Plaque commemorating the residence of George Sand at the Square d'Orléans

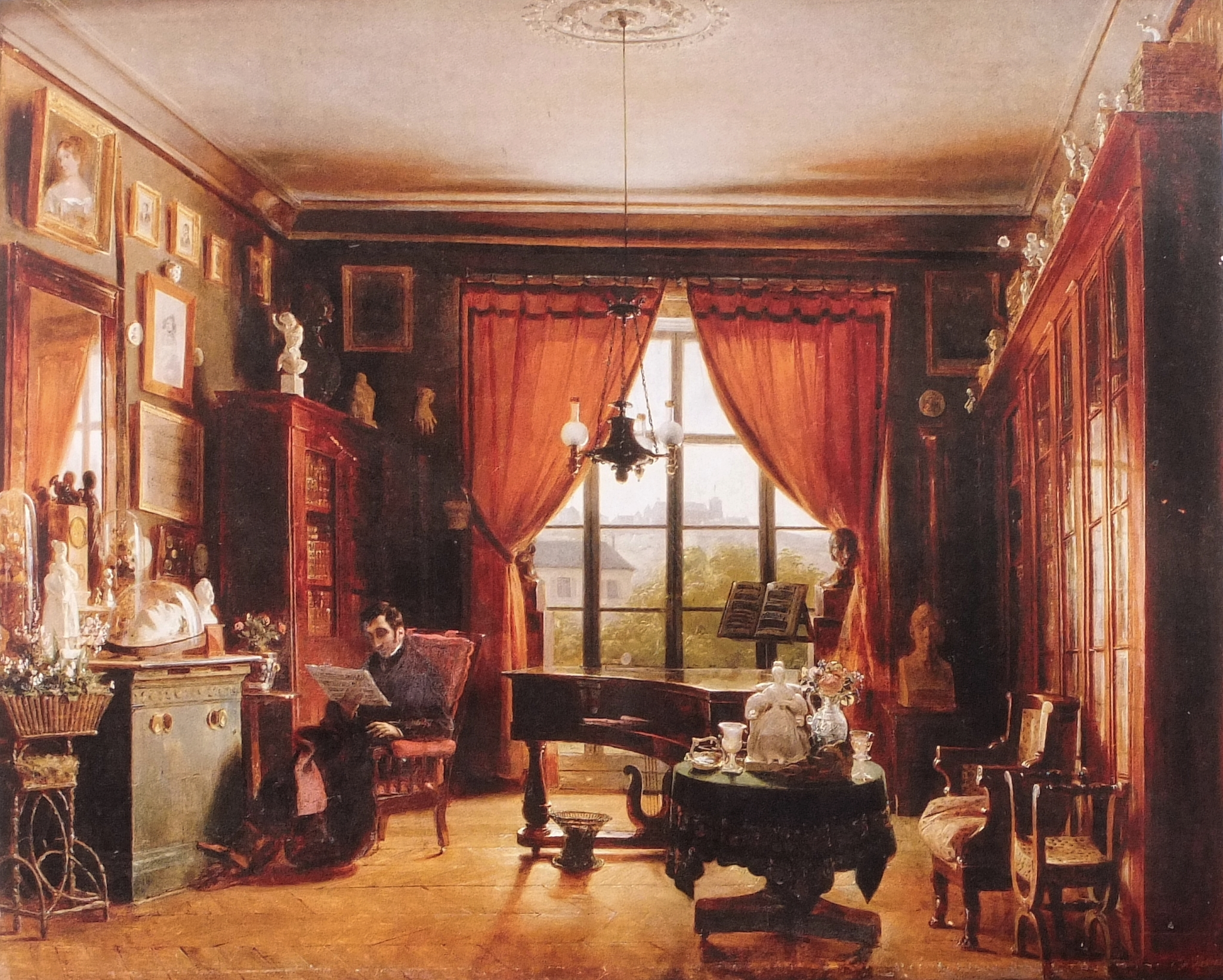
Le pianiste Pierre Joseph Guillaume Zimmermann dans son appartement Square d'Orléans à Paris. Painting by Prosper Lafaye, around 1850. Musée du château de Versailles.

The Square d'Orléans (also known as the Cité des Trois-Frères), is a residential square in the 9th arrondissement of Paris, at 80, rue Taitbout.

The square was designed by the English architect Edward Cresy, and built in 1829 on land that had originally belonged to the family of the musician Daniel Auber. The original entry to the square was at 36, rue Saint-Lazare. The name 'Square d'Orléans' was probably a tribute to Louis Philippe of the Orléans family, who became King of France in 1830. ('Trois-Frères', the alternative name for the square, is the name of a former part of the Rue Taitbout).

The facades of the interior courtyard are decorated by porches with Ionic half-pillars, in a style that is analogous to that of the terraces of Regent's Park, London, (e.g. Cumberland Terrace), designed by John Nash in the 1820s.

The Square became a fashionable residence in which many celebrities of the July Monarchy period took apartments, including Frédéric Chopin (Pavillon Nr. 9), George Sand (Pavillon Nr. 5), Marie Taglioni (Pavillon Nr. 2), Alexandre Dumas and Charles-Valentin Alkan (Pavillon Nr. 10).
