= DoubleTree by Hilton Brighton Metropole =

Hotel building in Brighton, United Kingdom

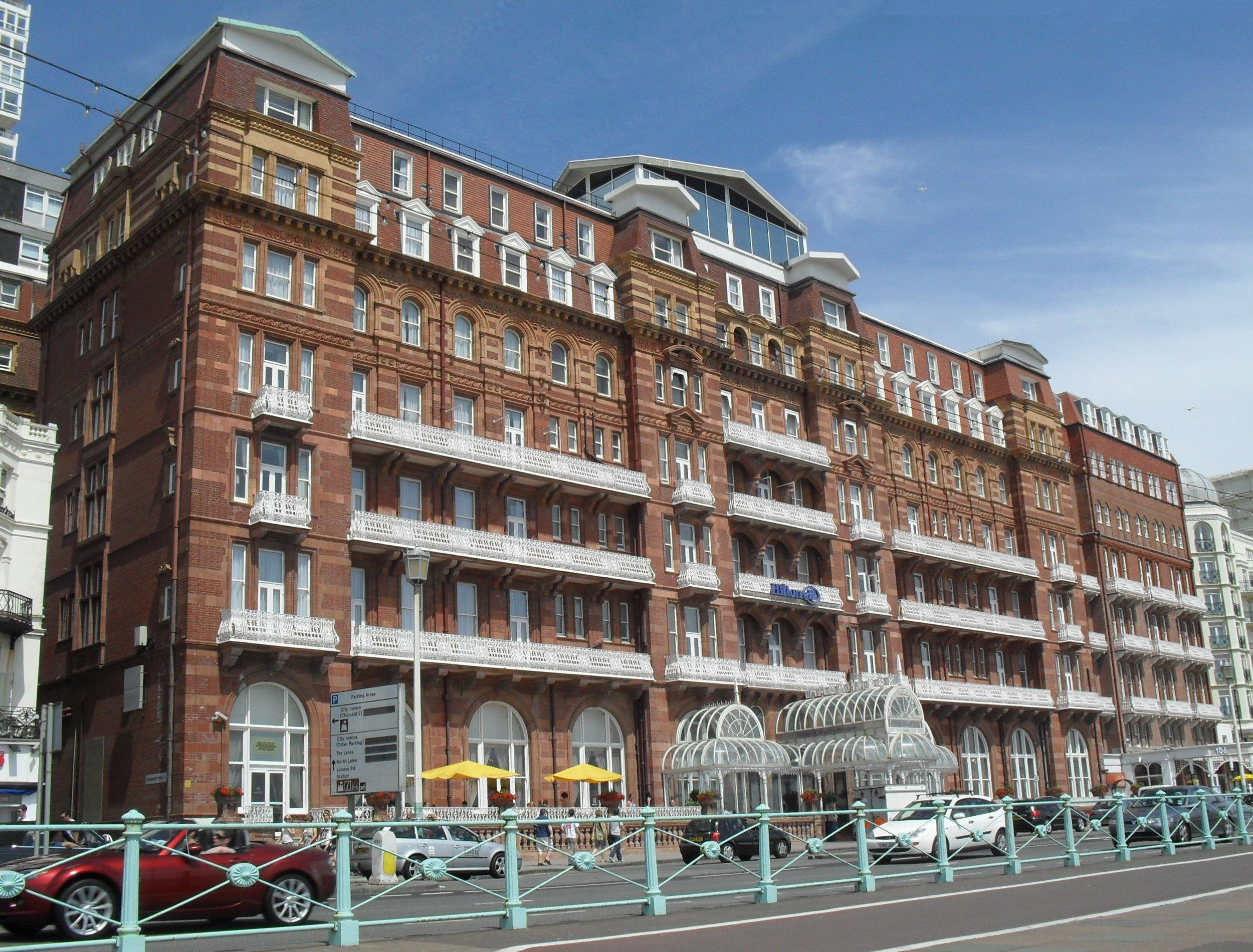
- The hotel from the south-southwest

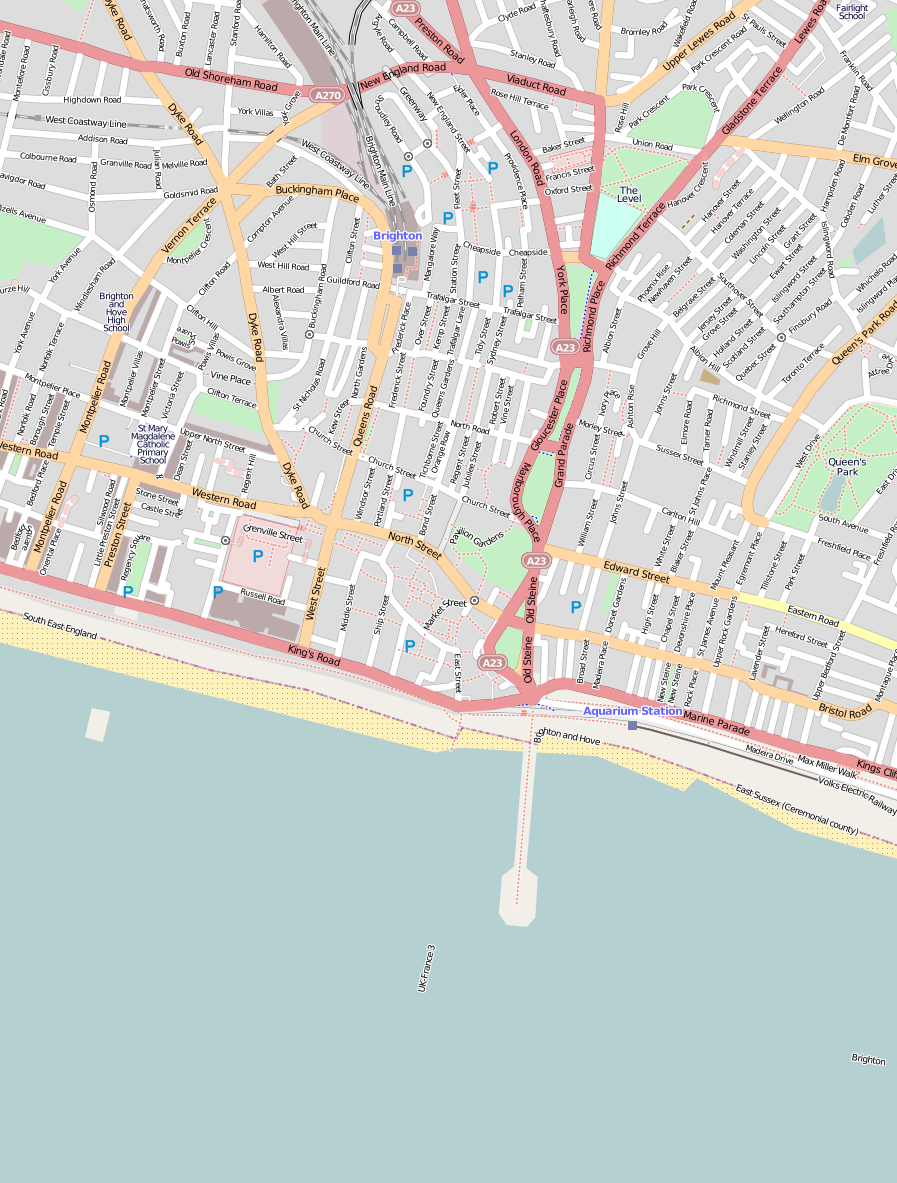
- Location within Brighton
- Hotel chain: Hilton Hotels & Resorts

General information
- Location: King's Road, Brighton BN1 2FU, United Kingdom
- Coordinates: 50.821818°N 0.148884°W
- Opening: 1890
- Cost: £57,000
- Owner: Topland Group
- Operator: Hilton Hotels

Technical details
- Floor count: 7

Design and construction
- Architect: Alfred Waterhouse
- Developer: Gordon Hotels Company

Other information
- Number of rooms: 321
- Number of restaurants: 1
- Parking: 200

Website
- Official website

The DoubleTree by Hilton Brighton Metropole is a 4-star hotel and conference centre located on the seafront in Brighton, East Sussex.

The architect was Alfred Waterhouse, who also was architect of University College London and the Natural History Museum, London.

Currently the UK's largest residential conference centre in the South of England, it was built in 1890 and has 321 bedrooms. The hotel has five lifts which three serve the tower block floors. The two original lifts were originally manually controlled and the other three were added in the 1970s including the goods lift. All five were installed by Otis Elevator Company.

In the 1960s or 1970s a two-storey flat block was built on top of the hotel for residential use. The flats are typical 1960s tower block style building and when the apartments were built onto the hotel. It is referenced in section 3, "The Fire Sermon" of T. S. Eliot's The Waste Land.

Previously it operated under the Stakis brand, and was owned by The Royal Bank of Scotland. Since 2000, the hotel has been operated by Hilton Hotels & Resorts, and its freehold is now owned by the Topland Group.

The hotel underwent a major renovation in 2023, where a 26-million pound refurbishment took place across all of the 321 guest rooms, as well as at the 1890 "At The Met" restaurant, the hotel’s bar and terrace. The public areas, reception and lobby were also renovated up until 10 May 2023, when the hotel officially rebranded from "Hilton Brighton Metropole" to "DoubleTree by Hilton Brighton Metropole", and operating under one of Hilton Worldwide's brands, DoubleTree by Hilton.

== Bibliography ==
- Collis, Rose (2010). The New Encyclopaedia of Brighton. (based on the original by Tim Carder) (1st ed.). Brighton: Brighton & Hove Libraries. ISBN 978-0-9564664-0-2.
