= Gouverneur Emerson =

American physician, statistician, and agriculturalist (1795-1874)

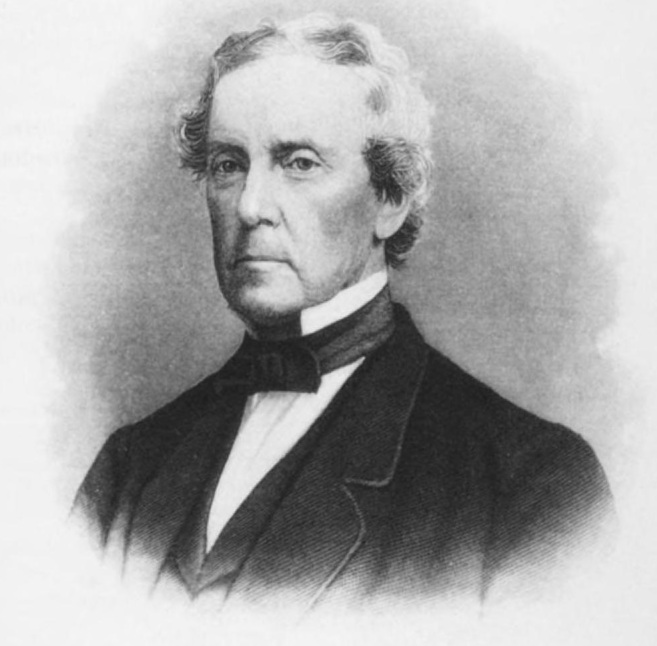
- Born: 1795
- Died: 1874 (aged 78–79)
- Occupation: Statistician, medical doctor

Gouverneur Emerson (August 4, 1795 – July 2, 1874) was an American traveler, agriculturist, and medical doctor.

== Biography ==
Eldest of the seven children of Jonathan and Ann Beel Emerson, was born August 4, 1795, near Dover, Kent County, Delaware. His grandparents having been received into the membership of the Duck Creek Meeting of the Society of Friends, Emerson was brought up in their faith. He attended the Westtown School in West Chester, Pennsylvania, and the classical school of the Reverend Stephen Sykes in Dover. Through his mother's ambition he began to study medicine when he was sixteen, under one of her cousins, Dr. James Sykes, a surgeon of some note in Dover and former governor of Delaware. Afterwards he attended medical lectures in Philadelphia. The University of Pennsylvania granted him his M. D. in March, 1816.

In 1816, owing to poor health, Emerson moved to and practiced near Montrose, Pennsylvania, but after two years accepted an appointment as surgeon on a merchant ship bound for China. His journal gives detailed account of his voyage and a dramatic account of being held up and robbed by Spanish pirates on the return voyage.

When Emerson returned to America he settled in Philadelphia where a yellow fever epidemic gave him an opportunity for usefulness which he used so well that he was appointed attending physician to the City Dispensary. The Board of Health being without authority to deal with smallpox as it did with other contagious diseases, Dr. Emerson turned his attention, when on the Board of Health, to necessary legislation concerning checking the disease. Statistics concerning smallpox are to be found in his article, "Medical and Vital Statistics," published in The American Journal of the Medical Sciences for November, 1827, 1831, and July, 1848. In 1833, Emerson was elected to the American Philosophical Society.

Dr. Emerson made some contributions to the improvement of the agriculture of his native place, editing the Farmer's Encyclopedia and Dictionary of Rural Affairs. His interest in agriculture increased until he was entirely occupied with its demands to the exclusion of medicine. He definitely gave up his large practice in 1857 and occupied himself with questions of political economy and social science for the remaining years of his life.

He died suddenly on July 2, 1874.
