= Silver Jubilee Crystal Crown =

Sculpture by Arthur Fleischmann

Coordinates: 51.5070°N 0.0726°W

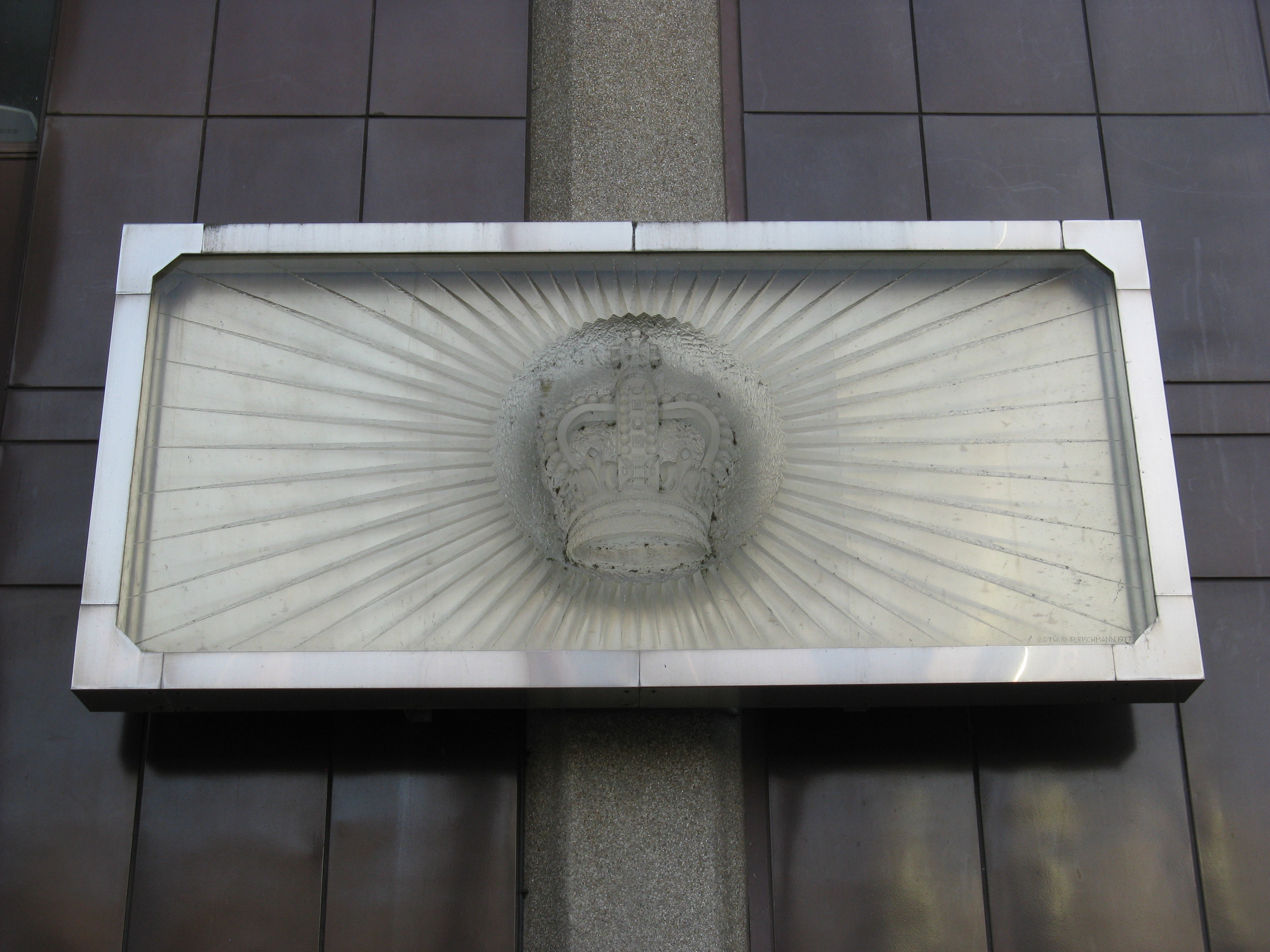
The Silver Jubilee Crystal Crown, mounted on the wall of the Tower Hotel

The Silver Jubilee Crystal Crown is a perspex sculpture by Arthur Fleischmann which has been displayed at the St Katharine Docks in London since the Silver Jubilee of Elizabeth II in 1977. A plaque nearby claims that it is the largest solid block of acrylic in the world.

The Crystal Crown is made from a large block of transparent perspex measuring approximately 10 feet 9 inches (328 cm) by 5 feet 9 inches (175 cm) by 8 inches (20 cm) and weighting about 2 tons. The block was cast by Stanley Plastics, having been commissioned by Stanley Kubrick to be used as the monolith in his 1968 film 2001: A Space Odyssey, but Kubrick rejected the transparent block in favour of an opaque plywood structure painted black. Fleischmann acquired the unused perspex block after MGM's Borehamwood studio closed in 1970.

Working in a temporary studio at St Katharine Docks, Fleischmann carved away on one side of the block, excavating a crown surrounded by the rays of a sunburst. The completed work was unveiled by Queen Elizabeth II on 5 June 1977 as part of the celebration of her Silver Jubilee, mounted inside the colonnade of the Coronarium Chapel at the docks in London.

The Coronarium was roofed over and converted into a coffee shop in 2000, and the Crystal Crown was moved and mounted on the side of the Tower Hotel as part of a lightbox that is backlit at night.

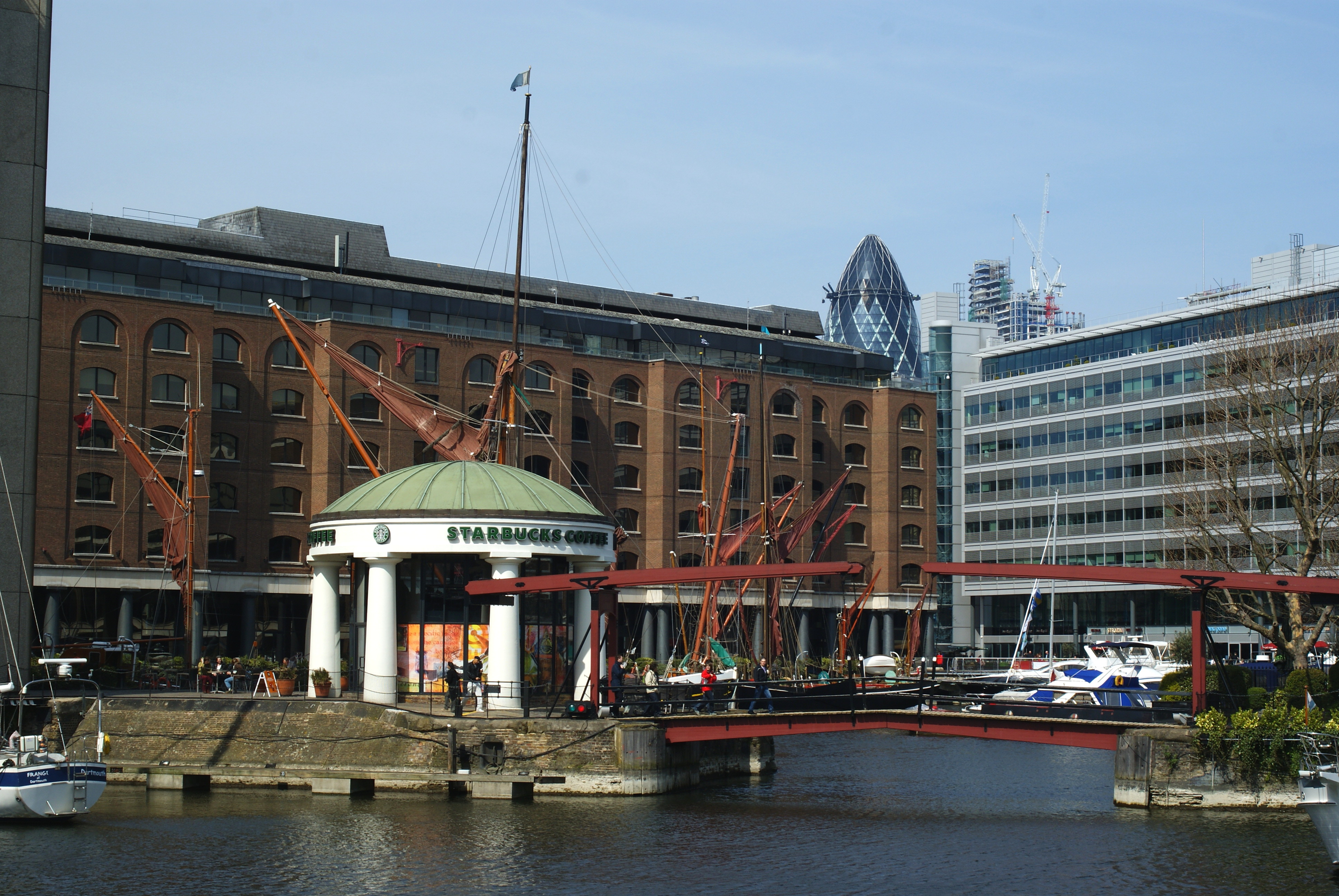
The Coronarium (then a Starbucks) in 2010

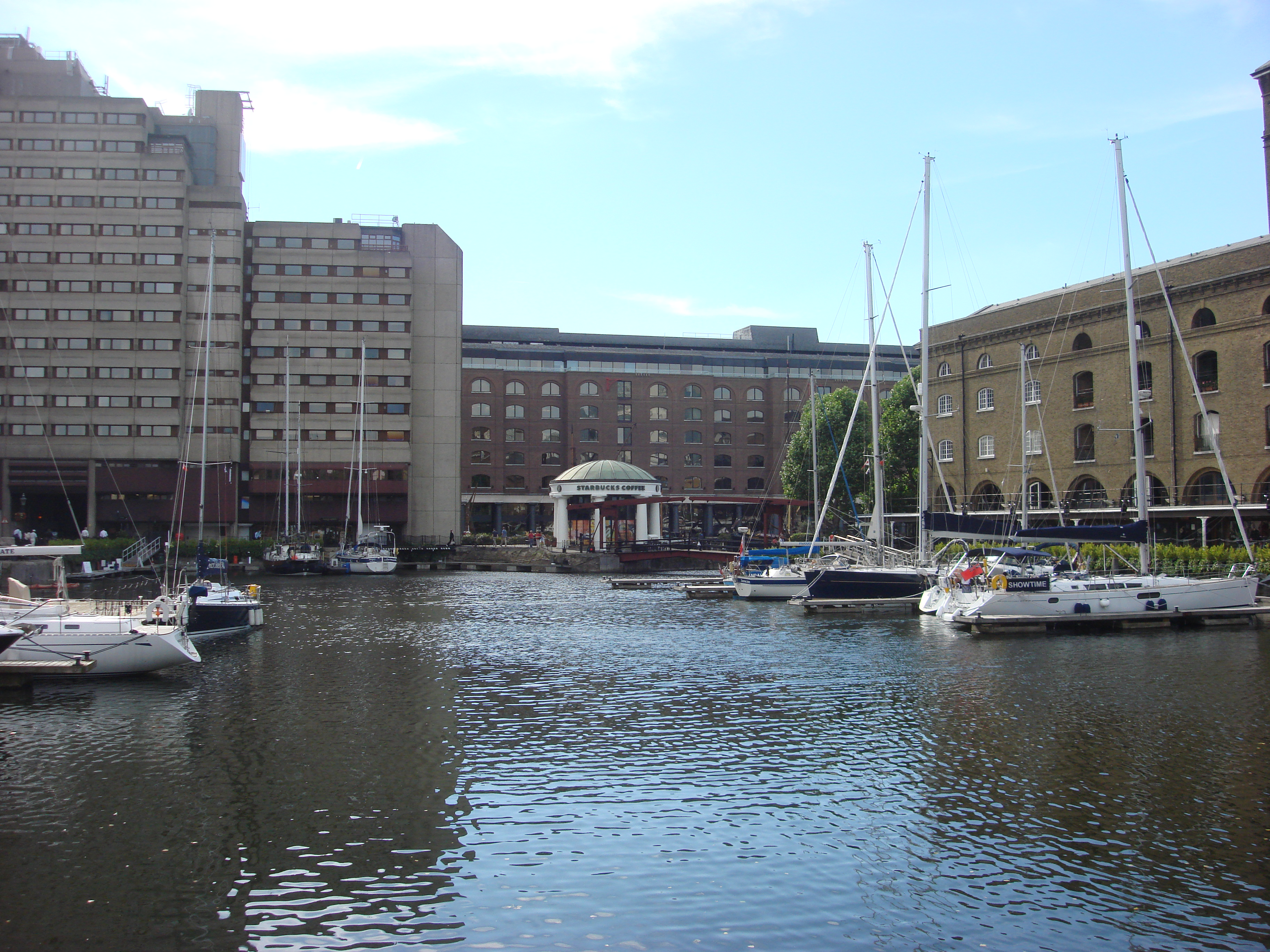
The Coronarium in 2009, with the Tower Hotel to the left

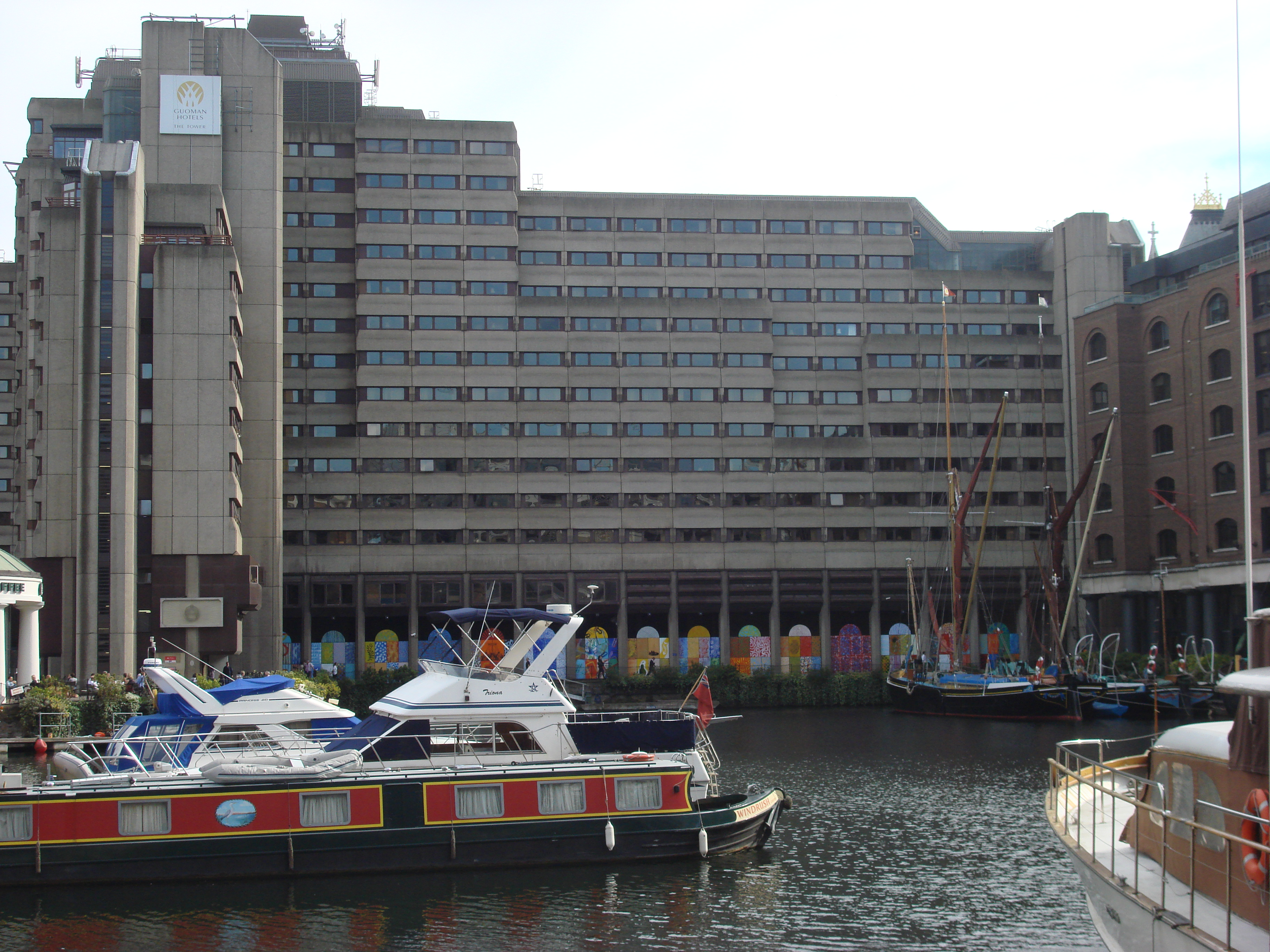
The Coronarium and the wall-mounted Crystal Crown (lower left) in 2009

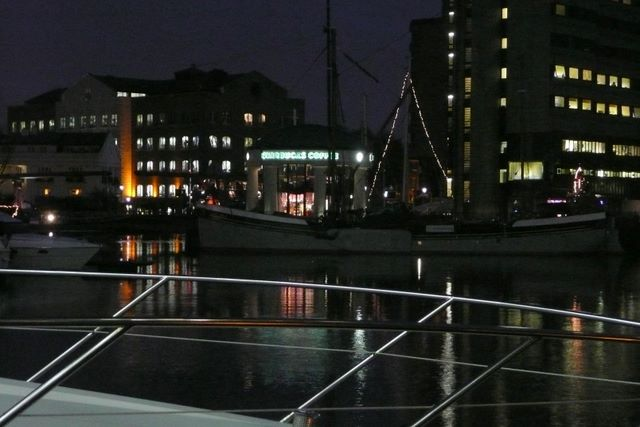
The Crystal Crown illuminated at night (lower right) in 2008
