= William Wedd Tuxford =

Australian politician

William Wedd Tuxford (bapt. 20 November 1826 – 28 January 1878) was a parliamentarian and agricultural machinery dealer in the early days of the Colony of South Australia.

He was born in Boston, Lincolnshire the son of John Tuxford and Hannah Parker, and apprenticed as a printer, at one stage working on the Mark Lane Express agricultural weekly partly, later fully, owned by his brother George Parker Tuxford (ca.1810–1870).

He arrived in South Australia in May 1853 and set himself up with brother John Lefevre Tuxford as the Colony's first importer of agricultural machinery, between Grote and Gouger Streets, near Selby Street, then opened on North Terrace in December 1858. They acted as Australian agents for Mark Lane Express, which they sold at the London cover price. Business dropped off however as local manufacture of such equipment boomed, compounded by some unsuccessful speculation in mining ventures, and was forced to close his machinery business, which ceased trading in 1873. He took up management of the City Arms Hotel on King William Street in July 1875.

He was elected to the Legislative Council on 1 March 1865, retiring on 2 February 1873, though he was never a prominent figure in Parliament or politics.

He was for many years a committee member of the Agricultural and Horticultural Society.

He was an active Freemason.

== Family ==
- Eldest brother George Parker Tuxford (c. 1810–1870) was the publisher of English magazines Mark Lane Express and the Farmer's Weekly.
- His brother John Lefevre Tuxford (1812 – 29 June 1887) arrived in South Australia in January 1839 on the Bardaster from London, married Clara Evans (c. 1838 – 12 September 1917). He was the manager of his brother Walsingham's Sportsman's Hotel on Byron Place, off Grote Street, until he joined his brother William in the machinery business. When that closed he resumed management of the hotel, which was run by his wife and daughters after his death. He was a substantial shareholder in the Yelta Mine on Yorke's Peninsula. He had five daughters and one son.

- Hannah Tuxford (1856 – 20 December 1935) married Henry Edwards Jones on 4 March 1879
- Zara Jane Tuxford (1858– ) married Joseph George Raphael on 9 April 1885

- Howard Stirling Raphael was an MP in Western Australia

- Clara Lydia Tuxford (1860– ) married Walter Bentley Dunk in 1891
- Marie "Polly" Tuxford (1861– ) married Andrew Monck on 15 November 1905
- George Lefevre Tuxford (1864– )
- Thomas Weston Tuxford (1865– ) married Emily Annie Barns in 1894
- Caroline Violet (1867– ) married Thomas Honnor on 21 April 1896

- His brother Walsingham Weston Tuxford (c. 1817 – 2 December 1875) also migrated to South Australia, married Mary Ann Williams (died 2 September 1875) in 1855. He was the owner of the Sportsman's Hotel run by his brother. He died from a self-inflicted throat laceration following business failures and the death of his wife.

- Walsingham Tuxford (1856– )
- Maria (1859– ) married Thomas Joseph MacMahon of Glenelg in 1886
- Ellen "Nellie" Tuxford (1862– ) married Frederick Lawrence Barlow on 28 October 1890
- William Tuxford (1864– ) married Emma Moon in 1890
- George Weston Tuxford (1867– )
- Mary Ann Tuxford (1869 – c. 20 April 1920)
- Eliza Rogerson Tuxford (1871– )

- His sister Hannah Parker Tuxford married Rev. Joseph Whitehead, of Spilsby, Lincolnshire.
- William Wedd Tuxford married Matilda Williams on 25 September 1858. Their five children included:

- Hannah Matilda Whitehead married Edward James Reynold, the mayor of Thebarton, on 13 December 1883.
- John James Whitehead (c. 1865 – 14 June 1900) married Eliza F. C. H. Hay on 27 May 1891
