= Thistle Hotels =

Company

- Type: Private
- Industry: Hospitality
- Founded: 1965
- Headquarters: Uxbridge, England, UK
- Area served: United Kingdom
- Key people: Gavin Taylor CEO; Quek Leng Chan Chairman
- Revenue: £287m (2004)
- Parent: Clermont Hotel Group
- Website: www.thistle.com

Thistle Hotels, a subsidiary of the Clermont Hotel Group, is a UK-based hotel company with a portfolio of 8 Central London hotels, one at London Heathrow and one in nearby Bedfordshire, operating in the three and four star sector.

== History ==
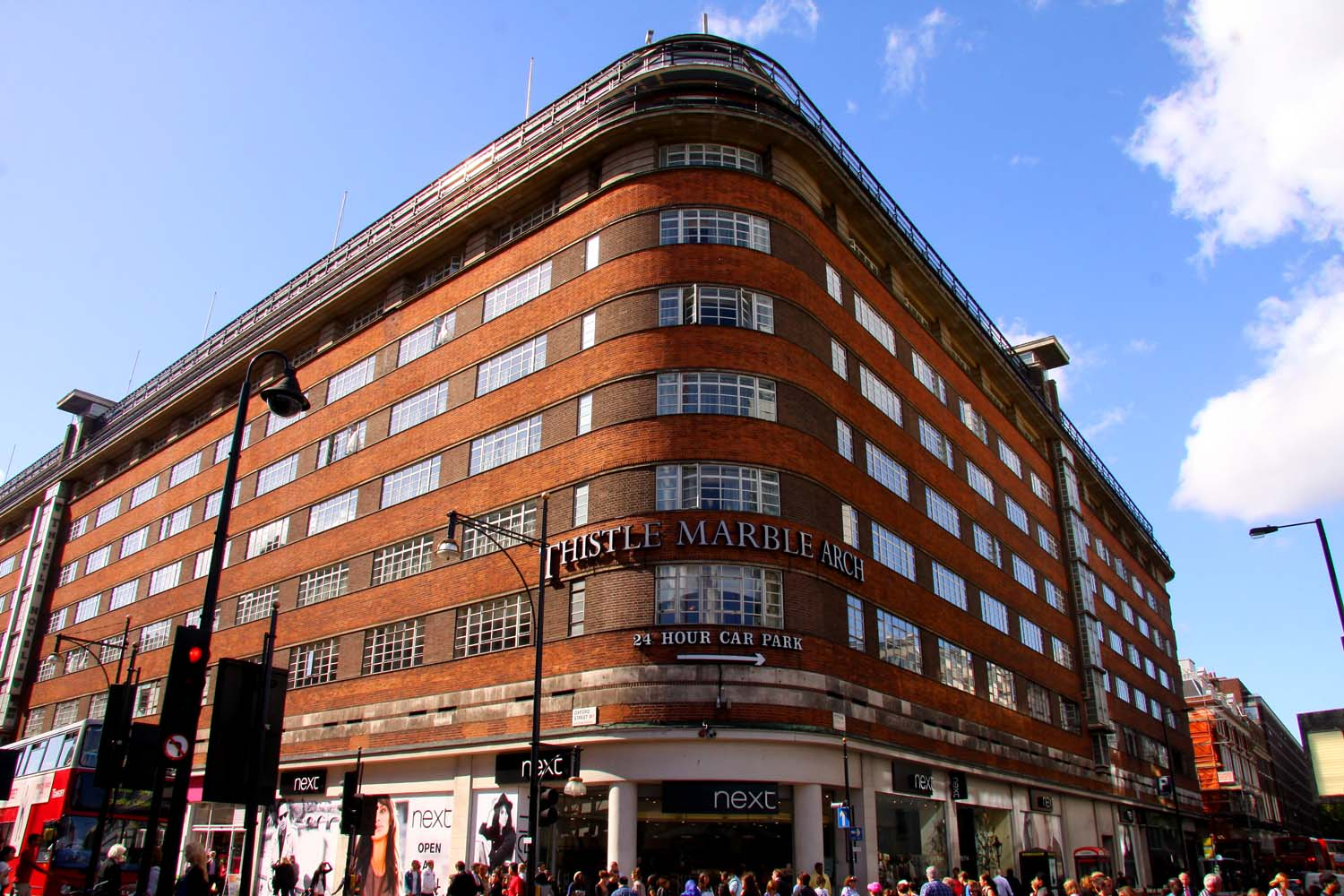
Thistle London Marble Arch Hotel

It was set up by Scottish & Newcastle in 1965, to combine its own traditional legacy hotels with purpose-built hotels. Mount Charlotte Investments bought thirty-four Thistle hotels from S&N, and acquired the Thistle brand name for £645m in November 1989. During the subsequent recession, the debt taken on to fund the transaction became unsustainable, resulting in Mount Charlotte being taken over by Brierley Investments of New Zealand for £664m in 1990.

The chain was the main shirt sponsor for Leeds United AFC from 1993 to 1996. In 1997, the company floated on the Stock Exchange, to become Thistle Hotels plc, valued at £620m. In September 1998, it sold 30 provincial hotels to Grace Hotels (owned by the Lehman Brothers investment bank) for £62.7m, becoming managed by Peel Hotels. In July 1999, it sold the Charles Dickens Hotel in London to the Ryan Hotel Group for £20m. In June 2002, it initially sold 37 of its hotels to Orb Estates of Jersey for £598m, continuing to manage the properties, but the hotels were eventually sold to Atlantic Hotels for £700m and operated under the Thistle name. In June 2003, the company was bought for £627m by BIL International, a private equity company based in Singapore (but registered in Bermuda) owned by the Hong Leong Group and the majority shareholder since 1990. Thistle Hotels was delisted from the London Stock Exchange. In 2004, it opened its Cumberland Hotel in London after a £95 million renovation, which operated under the Guoman brand. In May 2005, it sold six hotels to the Topland Group under a leaseback deal for £185m. It used to be based in The Calls in Leeds, then moved to Uxbridge.

In 2004, budget hotel company Travelodge bought two Thistle Hotels in London, the Thistle London Islington and the Thistle London Ryan. In 2008, Thistle Hotels announced that it was currently undergoing a £100 million re-branding to maintain consistency across the group. Thistle Cardiff the Parc reopened in September 2008 after being closed for 17 months due to fire and has been refurbished throughout. The hotel underwent a £15m transformation.

In 2015, the managed part of the estate was sold by its owners CIT Holdings Ltd. glh. was unsuccessful in its bid, meaning the majority of the provincial estate changed management, being run by Accor Hotels.

== Corporate affairs ==
The CEO was Tim Scoble until 2012, he was the CEO of Little Chef for two years from 2004 to 2006. He was succeeded by Mike De Noma who was CEO from 2012 - 2016, followed by Neil Gallagher from 2016 to 2018 and Alan Morgan from 2018 to 2020. The current CEO of the Clermont Hotel Group is Gavin Taylor.

== Locations ==
Clermont Hotel Group, parent company of Thistle, also previously operated three hotels in London under the Guoman brand, Tower Hotel, The Cumberland and the Royal Horseguards Hotel, which have now rebranded under their own names.
