= George William Johnson (writer) =

British writer (1802–1886)

- Born: 4 November 1802; Blackheath, Kent, England
- Died: 29 October 1886 (aged 83); Waldronhurst, Croydon, England
- Education: Gray's Inn
- Occupation: Writer
- Relatives: William Johnson (father), Cuthbert William Johnson (brother)
- Writing career
- Period: 1828–1873
- Subject: Gardening

George William Johnson (4 November 1802 – 29 October 1886), was a British writer on gardening.

== Biography ==
=== Early life ===
Johnson, born at Blackheath, Kent, was younger son of William Johnson, proprietor successively of the Vauxhall distillery, of the Coalbrookdale china-works, and of salt-works at Heybridge in Essex.

At Heybridge Johnson and his elder brother, Cuthbert William Johnson, first found employment, and carried out experiments in the application of salt as manure, which they recounted in An Essay on the Uses of Salt for Agriculture. One of their discoveries was an economical method of separating sulphate of magnesia, or Epsom salts, from seawater. As early as 1826 Johnson sent articles to Loudon's Gardener's Magazine.

His first independent work was A History of English Gardening, Chronological, Biographical, Literary, and Critical in 1829. It contains a vast amount of information, and exhibits great patience and research. At Great Totham, where he resided, he conducted experiments in gardening, and especially in the manufacture of manures. His History of the Parish of Great Totham, Essex, was printed at the private press of Charles Clarke, in 1831. In 1835 he published Memoirs of John Selden, which was dedicated to Lord Stanley. The two brothers in 1839 edited an edition of Paley's works, in which the Evidences of Christianity were undertaken by the younger brother.

=== Call to the bar ===
Both had become students of Gray's Inn on 6 January 1832, and were called to the bar on 8 June 1836. Johnson's professional opinion given to the churchwardens of Braintree, Essex, that the minority could make a rate to repair the church if the church were really in a dangerous condition, was, in January 1846, sustained by the court of exchequer, but was ultimately reversed in 1853 on an appeal to the House of Lords.

=== Move to India ===
In 1839 he was appointed professor of moral and political economy in the Hindoo college at Calcutta; became one of the editors of the Englishman newspaper there, and edited the government Gazette while Lord Auckland was governor-general (1837–41). On his return to England in 1842, he wrote The Stranger in India, or Three Years in Calcutta in 1843.

=== Return to England ===
He now settled at Winchester, and, again turning his attention to gardening pursuits, edited annually the Gardeners' Almanack for the Stationers' Company from 1844 to 1866.

In 1845 was published The Principles of Practical Gardening, which was subsequently much enlarged and reissued in 1862 as The Science and Practice of Gardening. A Dictionary of Gardening appeared in 1846, and met with a good reception, and The Cottage Gardener's Dictionary was published in 1852; a supplement to the latter is dated 1868. In 1847 Johnson commenced a series of works called The Gardener's Monthly Volume, the first portion of which, on the potato, was written by himself. Twelve volumes of this series appeared.

On the death of his father-in-law, Newington Hughes, banker, Maidstone, Johnson succeeded to his property, when the Fairfax manuscripts came into his possession. These valuable documents, which had been rescued from a shoemaker at Maidstone, were in 1848–9 published as the Fairfax Correspondence in four large volumes, the first two of which were edited by Johnson, the last two by Robert Bell (1800–1867). On 5 October 1848 appeared the first number of Johnson's Cottage Gardener, which was at once successful. When in 1851 Dr. Robert Hogg became joint editor, the title was changed to the Journal of Horticulture.

=== Death ===
Johnson died at his residence, Waldronhurst, Croydon, on 29 October 1886, and was buried in the grounds of St. Peter's Church on 4 November.

== Bibliography ==
- An Essay on the Uses of Salt for Agriculture, 2nd edit. 1821, 3rd edit. 1830, 13th edit. 1838.
- A History of English Gardening, Chronological, Biographical, Literary, and Critical, 1829.
- History of the Parish of Great Totham, Essex, (publisher Charles Clarke), 1831.
- Memoirs of John Selden, 1835.
- Outlines of Chemistry, by C. W. and G. W. Johnson, 1828.
- The Stranger in India/Three Years in Calcutta, 1843.
- The Principles of Practical Gardening, 1845.
- The Potato Murrain and its Remedy, 1846.
- Dictionary of Gardening, 1846.
- The Gardener's Monthly Volume, 1847.
- Cottage Gardener, 1848.
- The Domestic Economist, 1850.
- Journal of Horticulture, 1851.
- The Cottage Gardener's Dictionary, 1852.
- (with the Rev. W. W. Wingfield). The Poultry Book, 1853; another edit. 1856.
- The British Ferns popularly described, 1857; 4th edit. 1861.
- (with others). The Garden Manual, 1857, &c.
- The Chemistry of the World, 1858.
- Muck for the Many, or the Economy of House Sewage, 1860.
- Science and Practice of Gardening, 1862.
- (with R. Hogg). The Wild Flowers of Great Britain, 1863.
- (with others). The Greenhouse, 1873.

He also translated A Selection of Eatable Funguses, by M. Plues, 1866.
