= The Clermont, Victoria =

Hotel in London

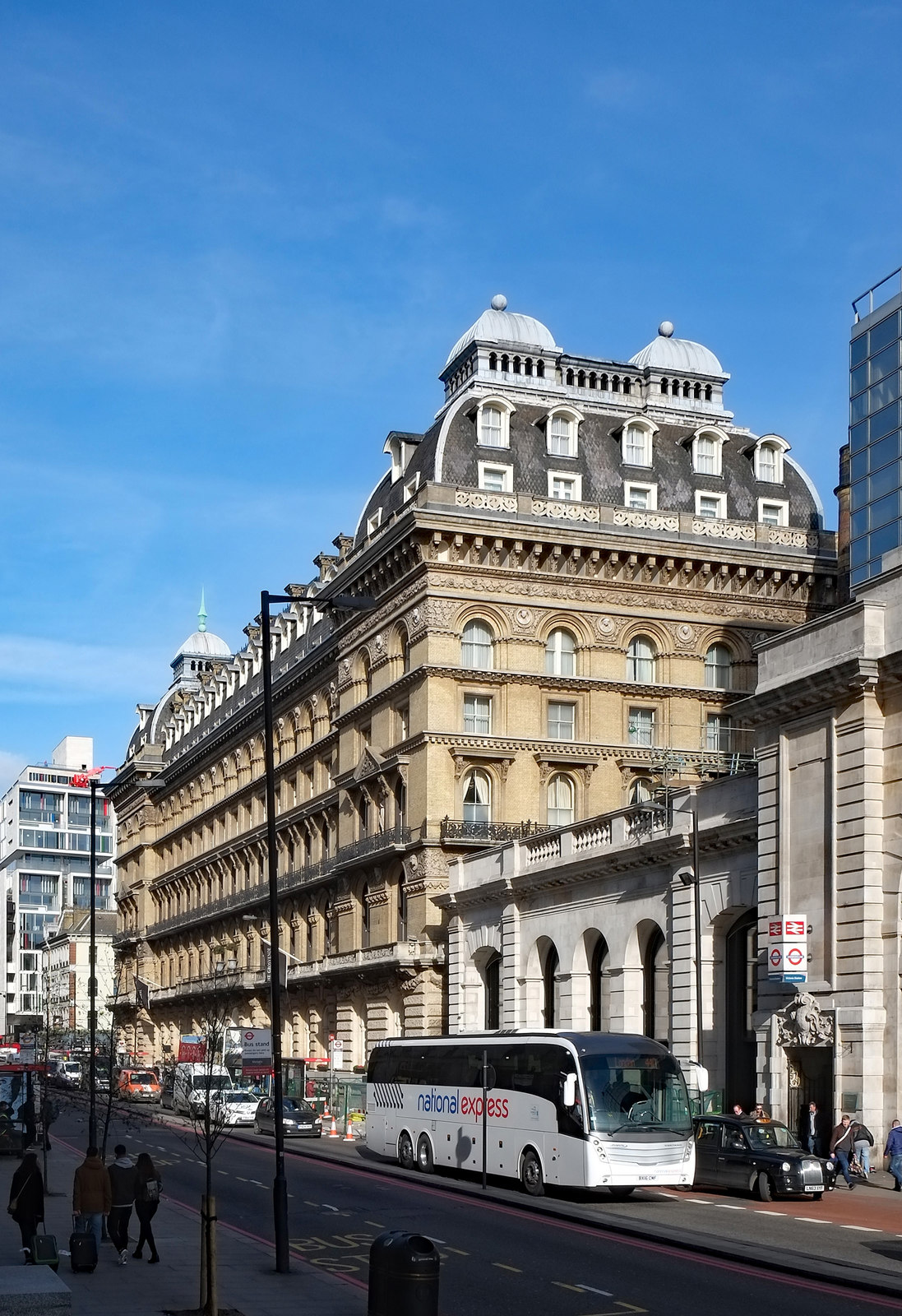

- Location within Central London

General information
- Location: Buckingham Palace Road, London, SW1W 0SJ, United Kingdom
- Coordinates: 51.4957°N 0.1453°W
- Opened: 1862
- Operator: Clermont Hotel Group

Design and construction
- Architect: James Thomas Knowles

Other information
- Number of rooms: 348
- Number of suites: 10

Website
- Official website

The Clermont, Victoria, originally known as The Grosvenor Hotel, is a historic hotel in Victoria, London opened in 1862. It is Grade II* listed for its architectural and historic interest, being cited as "one of the first buildings in London to use a French pavilion roof".

== History ==
With Victoria station being opened in 1860, the hotel was built to service travellers with one of its entrances leading into the station concourse. It was developed by John Kelk who had been involved in construction of the Victoria Station and Pimlico Railway and would also develop much of the Grosvenor Gardens area.

In 2025, plans for a nearby playground were advised against with the Grade II* listed hotel's view being harmed as one of the cited reasons, although it was stated not to be a primary concern.

== Architecture ==
The hotel is built largely of yellow brick and Bath stone with rustication on the ground floor. Designed by James Thomas Knowles, the hotel's design is eclectic in style but mainly pulls on motifs of French Renaissance and Baroque as well as Italianate architecture. Its French Renaissance inspired design set the precedent for the later developments of similar character and style in the nearby Grosvenor Gardens with Thomas Cundy III serving as their architect. Together they make up the Grosvenor Gardens conservation area.
