= Liberator Building Society =

- Type: Building society
- Industry: Financial services
- Founded: 1868
- Founder: Jabez Balfour
- Defunct: 1892
- Fate: Failed due to speculation and fraud
- Headquarters: London, England
- Key people: Jabez Balfour
- Products: Loans, mortgages and savings accounts

The Liberator Building Society was a British building society that was formed in 1868 by Jabez Balfour and failed in 1892 due to fraud perpetrated by its founder.

Balfour used his widespread nonconformist and temperance connections to raise funds. It had become the largest building society in the country by the 1890s. However, by the end, most of the mortgages were to finance speculative developments by other Balfour-controlled companies at prices which were fraudulent.

In 1892, Balfour's bank collapsed, followed by some of his development companies. The Liberator Building Society was unable to meet the demand for withdrawals, and in October 1892 a liquidator was appointed. More than £8m was lost to the Liberator and its associates.

== History ==
=== The early years ===
The Building Societies Gazette reported 30 cases of fraud between 1871 and 1891, but the collapse of the Liberator in 1892 was on an altogether different scale. The society was founded in 1868 as The Liberator Permanent Building and Investment Society, a name it kept till the end. Jabez Spencer Balfour was first its vice-chairman, then secretary, managing director and president. Whatever the title, he was "the main force behind the Society". His father was a director of the Temperance Building Society, a model for the early years of the Liberator; his mother was a celebrated lecturer, writer and temperance campaigner. As a result, his connections were extensive and he surrounded himself with prominent Baptists, Congregationalists and temperance leaders. He achieved national prominence, and among extensive appointments he was MP for Tamworth in 1880, first mayor of Croydon in 1883, and MP for Burnley in 1889. The head office was established at 20 Budge Row, Cannon Street, London.

Balfour announced that the main objects of the proposed society were "to assist the building of Nonconformist chapels and to afford facilities to persons desirous of purchasing house property on desirous terms". Founders included one Lord, four MPs and six ministers and laymen. It is difficult to exaggerate the prominence and connections of those on the notepaper. The growth of the society was to be implemented through an extensive network of agencies among nonconformist and temperance members, paying generous commission; within a few years there were over 500 ministers and laymen on the agency roll. For the first few years, advances were made on small houses for owner occupation spread across southern England and Wales. Assets exceeded £1m after ten years and the Liberator was the largest society after 15 years.

After four years the process of dealing with single houses was considered slow, and therefore Balfour formed independent companies to build hundreds of houses, the object being to finance their construction and then to mortgage the individual houses. For ten years the Liberator continued with ordinary business, but the loans to Lands Allotment Company and to the House and Land Investment Company took an increasingly large percentage of assets; by 1880, mortgages to these two accounted for 20% of the Liberator assets. Both these companies were quoted on the London Stock Exchange in the early 1880s, as was the National Model Dwellings Company All three had a minimum of Balfour and the Liberator Chairman on their Boards. The business of the Liberator was clearly changing. Conventional building society business declined and by 1885 accounted for only 15% of assets. Instead, the Liberator was increasingly lending to its associate companies’ speculative non-housing developments. Amongst others, these included blocks of flats, hotels, land reclamation on the Isle of Wight, chemical works and collieries. This was inherently riskier than conventional house mortgages, but the real danger was that the lending was fraudulent.

=== The Fraud ===
The fraud centred on the relationship between the Liberator and the various other development companies associated with or controlled by Balfour. The technique was the simple one of buying a property and selling it on at an excessive price to another Balfour company. This asset would then be mortgaged to the Liberator in full at the new price. Frequently, the property company could not make money at that inflated price nor pay interest to the Liberator; that interest was then capitalised (added to the value of the loan). Although several Balfour companies had dealings with the Liberator, two thirds of the mortgages were with the builder J. W. Hobbs, which went public in 1885. In 1887, the auditors did issue a warning to the directors about the security of the interest the Liberator paid to its depositors, but in the absence of any response from the well-remunerated directors, the auditors still issued a certificate stating that the balance sheet agreed with the books.

=== The Failure ===
Eventually the inflow of new money became insufficient to pay depositors, and Balfour started to borrow money on the strength of its first and second mortgages. During 1892 rumours about the Liberator increased, and questions were being asked, which in turn led to heavy withdrawals from the society and two allied companies: London & General Bank and House and Land Investment Trust. On 2 September 1892, Balfour's London & General Bank suspended payment. Immediately, the Liberator was unable meet withdrawals, and depositors were told that they could only be paid in rotation. The directors called a preliminary meeting of the largest shareholders and depositors "to discuss a scheme whereby the assets of the society will be preserved for its shareholders and depositors". The directors stood by the asset valuations and claimed the society was still solvent and asked for time to effect a reconstruction. The shareholders duly held their own meeting to propose an alternative scheme of reconstruction, while recognising that the run on deposits made it difficult to provide funds necessary to complete the associate companies' buildings.

No agreement on refinancing could be reached, and on 4 October the Liberator was the subject of a compulsory winding up order.

Hobbs and other building associates were charged the following year. Balfour fled to the Argentine, but was brought back in dramatic fashion in 1895 and sentenced to 14 years.
