= Clermont Hotel Group =

British-based global hotel company

- Company type: Subsidiary
- Industry: Hospitality industry
- Genre: Leisure
- Headquarters: London, England
- Area served: United Kingdom
- Key people: Jon Scott (CEO)
- Services: Hotels
- Number of employees: 1,917 (2005)
- Parent: GL Limited
- Divisions: Thistle Hotels; Thistle Express; Guoman Hotels; The Clermont
- Website: clermonthotel.group

Clermont Hotel Group, formerly named GLH Hotels Management and branded as glh., is a British-based global hotel company, headquartered in London, and subsidiary of GL Limited.

== Overview ==
Clermont Hotel Group is the largest owner-operator hotel management company in London with over 5,000 hotel rooms. As of 2024, it operates properties under the following four hotel brands:

- The Clermont (3)
- Guoman Hotels (2)
- Thistle Hotels (9)
- Thistle Express (1)

== History ==
On 11 June 2013, GLH announced its new global owner-operator strategy focusing on the 100 global cities with a 10-year ambition to become "the world’s best managed hospitality company", delivering "the best guest centred experience in the industry". According to their press release, they would launch three new brands within the following 12 months. Prior to the relaunch in June 2013, GLH operated under the name Guoman Hotel Management (UK) Limited.

On 23 October 2013, GLH launched Amba, a global 4-star hotel brand catering to “the discerning business and leisure traveller”. The first four Amba hotels were expected to be located in London with a total of 2,088 rooms available in 2015. The four launch properties announced by GLH are situated in Marble Arch, Tower Bridge, Charing Cross and Buckingham Palace Road in London. The Grosvenor Hotel on Buckingham Palace Road will be the first to open in June 2014. GLH also announced its plans to open the Amba brand across 30 UK cities and expand internationally in China, the US and Europe. Halfway through 2021 the Amba-hotels were rebranded to "The Clermont". As a result, former Amba Hotel Charing Cross and Grosvenor would continue as The Clermont Charing Cross and The Clermont Victoria.

The company is owned by GL Limited, an international investment company headquartered in Singapore renamed from BIL International Limited, and has a primary listing on the Singapore Exchange, with secondary listings on the London and New Zealand Stock Exchanges. The company's primary role is as an active investor with strategic shareholdings and active investment management.

In October 2022, GLH announced its rebranding into the Clermont Hotel Group.
