= Heubach (disambiguation) =

Heubach is a town in Baden-Württemberg, Germany.

Heubach may also refer to:

- Heubach (Emmer), river of North Rhine-Westphalia, Germany, tributary of the Emmer
- Heubach (Halterner Mühlenbach), river of North Rhine-Westphalia, Germany, upstream of the Halterner Mühlenbach
- Heubach (Kinzig), river of Baden-Württemberg, Germany, tributary of the Kinzig
- Heubach (Main), river of Bavaria, Germany, tributary of the Main
- Ernst Heubach, a company of Thuringia that manufactured porcelain-headed bisque dolls

== People with the surname ==
- Heike Heubach (born 1979), German politician
- Jeroen Heubach (born 1974), Dutch footballer
- Silvia Heubach, German-American mathematician
- Tim Heubach (born 1988), German footballer
