= Armand Marseille =

German doll manufacturer

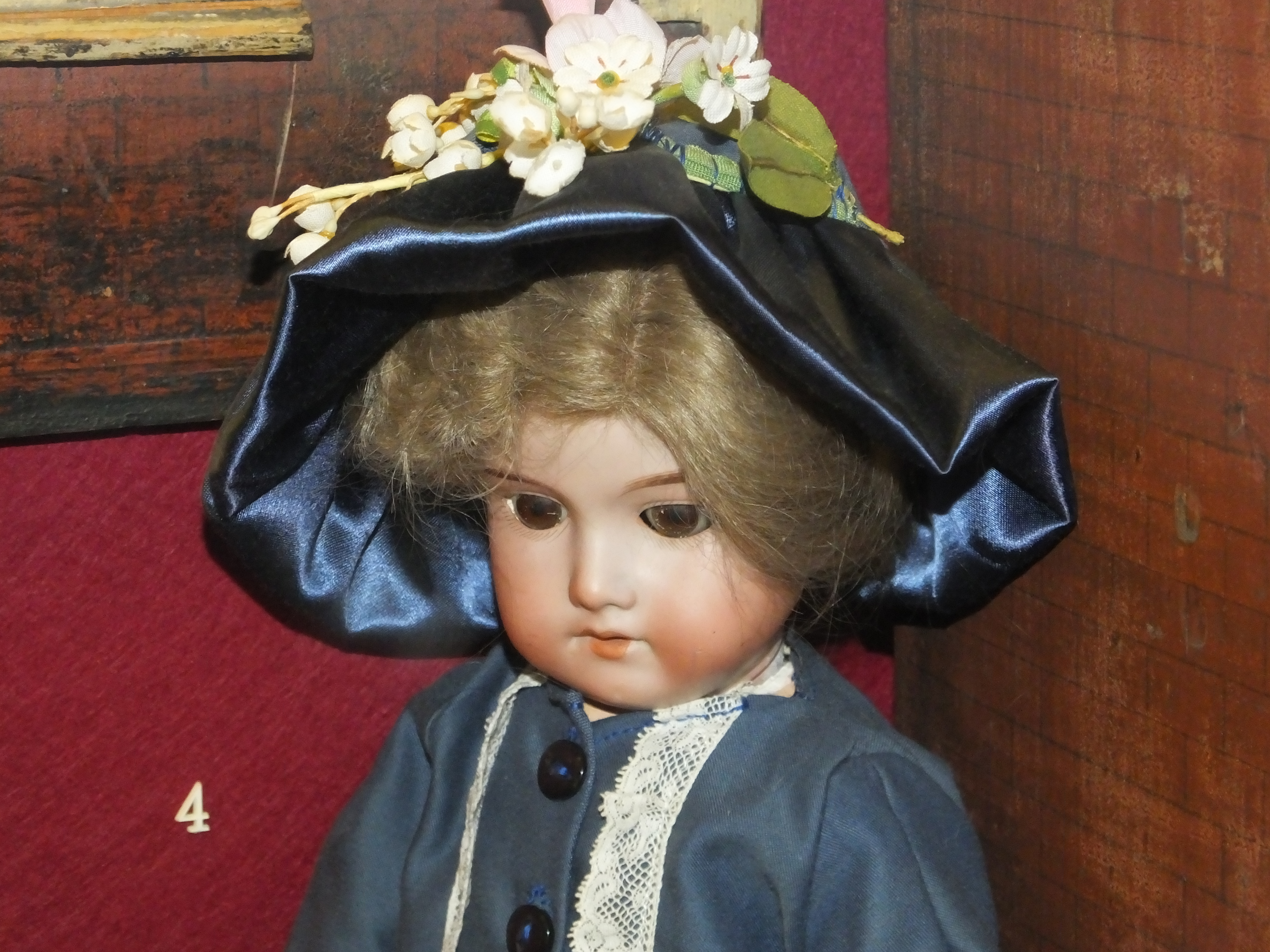
Armand Marseille bisque headed doll with composition body, in Rochester Guildhall Museum

Armand Marseille was a company in Köppelsdorf, Thuringia, Germany, that manufactured porcelain headed (bisque) dolls from 1885 onwards.

== Location ==
Köppelsdorf is a part of Sonneberg, in the Landkreis Sonneberg, in Thuringia 150 km (93 mi) due north of Nuremberg. For fifty years the wooded countryside formed the border between the two Germanys, Sonneberg lying in the GDR. Sonneberg was the centre of the German toy-making industry; it is the home of the German Toy Museum, many doll manufacturers and PIKO model railways.

== History ==
Armand Marseille was born in 1856 in St. Petersburg, Russia, the son of an architect, and emigrated to Germany with his family in the 1860s. In 1884 he bought the toy factory of Mathias Lambert in Sonneberg. He started producing porcelain dolls' heads in 1885, when he acquired the Liebermann & Wegescher porcelain factory in Köppelsdorf. In 1919 the firm merged with Ernst Heubach but they separated in 1932. The combined firm was known as the "Vereinigte Köppelsdorf Porzellanfabrik vorm. Armand Marseille und Ernst Heubach". Maximum production was 1000 dolls heads a day. Production continued to around 1930.

== Works ==
The company manufactured bisque heads from moulds for their own dolls and for other doll-makers. They never made the bodies but brought them in from other manufacturers.

Mould 390 and mould 370 are the most common. 390 was a head mould that was fitted to a composition body; 370 had identical features but was a head and shoulders mould that fitted to a stuffed leather (kid) body. This mould was used for over thirty years. The dolls are stamped with a variety of marks that usually contain the initials A.M.

Armand Marseille made a large variety of baby dolls, dolly-faced child dolls and character dolls. Brand names include Floradora, Queen Louise, Darling Dolly, the Dream Baby and Just Me.

The 1894 Floradora design came in various sizes from 23 cm (9.1 in) to 107 cm (42 in).
