= Louis Thomas Jérôme Auzoux =

French anatomist and naturalist (1797–1880)

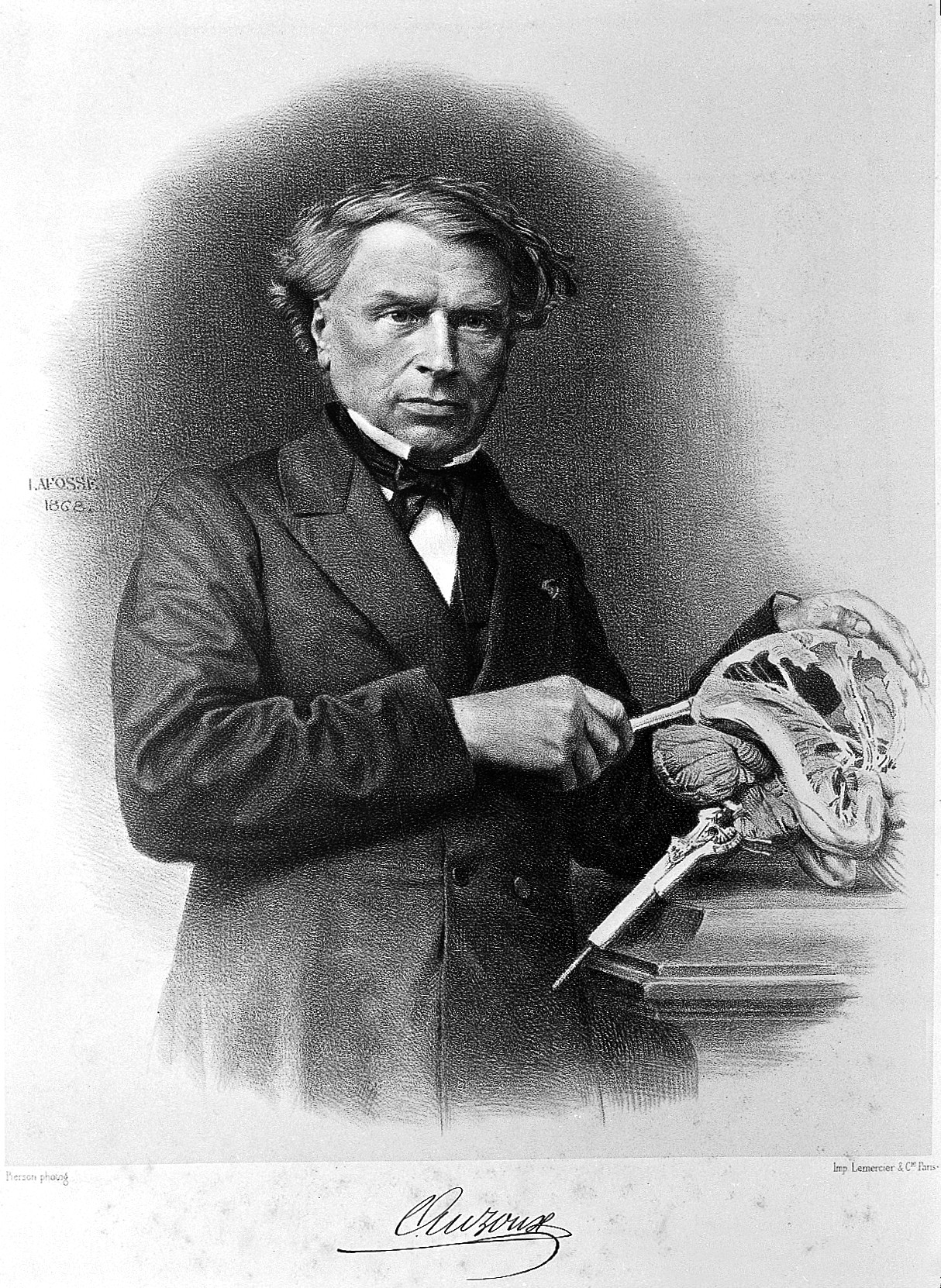
Louis Thomas Jerome Auzoux

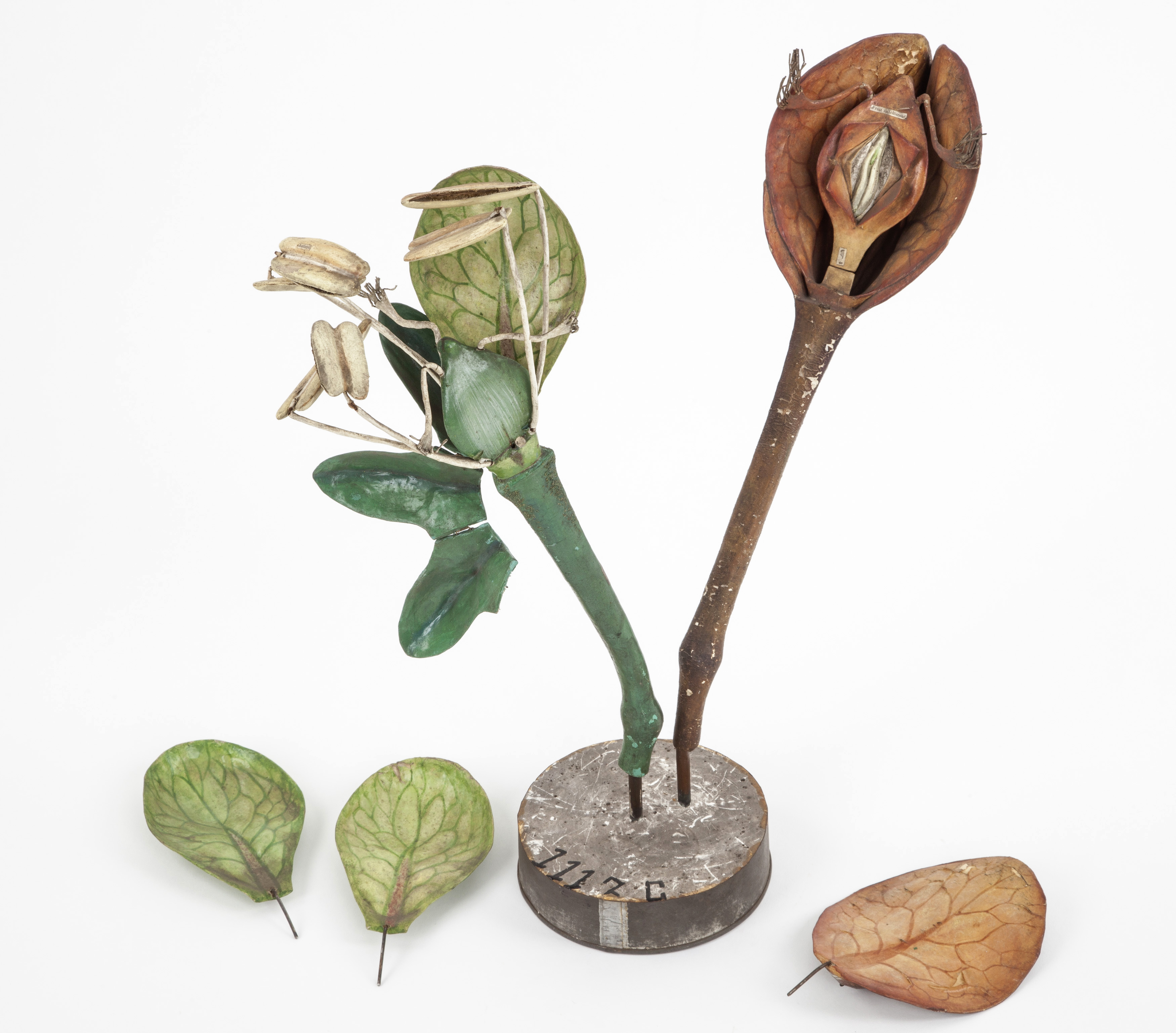
Flowers and seeds of Rumex in papier mache

Louis Thomas Jérôme Auzoux (7 April 1797 Saint-Aubin-d'Écrosville – 7 March 1880 Paris) was a French anatomist and naturalist.

== Life ==
Louis Auzoux obtained a medical degree in 1818 and was appointed to the surgical department of the Hotel-Dieu with Guillaume Dupuytren. In 1820 he visited the papier-mâché workshop of Jean-François Ameline and later (1827) set up a workshop making very accurate human and veterinary anatomical models in his Normandy birthplace Saint-Aubin-d'Écrosville. This traded as Maison Auzoux. Auzoux also made large scale zoological and botanical models for educational use. The models were called "anatomy clastique" (Greek klastos - broken in pieces), because they could be taken apart to show the full structure. The company also traded in other natural history material.

== Fabrication process ==
The process invented by Dr Auzoux consisted in a mix of paper pulp, glue and cork powder, pressed in paper-lined molds, following papier-maché method.

For simpler, less articulated pieces, like large-scale representations of organs, he used plaster molds lined with several layers of colored paper imbibed with glue. The glue-moistened paper follows every detail of the mold; the layers, starting with thin paper then progressing on heavier paper, will give resistance to the future piece. The use of papers of different colours helps keeping trace of the layers. As many as twelve layers of paper could be used. The model thus obtained was hollow, light and resistant.

For articulated pieces, he designed a paste that would dry in a material dense enough that fasteners and hinges could be fixed, or include metal frames for larger models. The molds used in that case were in a metal alloy. Workers would line them with a paper and cardboard shell, consisting of only 3 to 4 layers, then fill them with the paste, called "terre" = earth, made of flour glue, shredded paper, shredded oakum, chalk and cork powder, the latter said to be the crucial ingredient in the mix. The mold was then closed and placed under a press to compact the paste and spread it into the finest details. The dried pieces were then completed with details such as veins, arteries and nerves made of fabric-covered metal wires, equipped with closing hooks, painted, labelled, varnished and assembled.

== The anatomical models factory in Saint-Aubin-d'Écrosville ==
The success met in France and abroad by his anatomical reproductions, due to their technicity and accuracy led the Dr. Auzoux to found a workshop in his birthplace village Saint-Aubin-d'Écrosville (Eure, France). The number of workers grew and by 1868, more than eighty men and women were employed to produce hundred of pieces sold worldwide each year. A shop was also opened 8 rue du Paon in Paris in 1833, that would ship sales in France and other countries. When Louis Auzoux died in 1880, his clastic anatomical models were internationally known and his society prosperous. The competition and multiplication of other kinds of teaching aids for the study of anatomy (photography, video, digital models, plastination...) led the Auzoux firm to turn to other materials, like cheaper resin models in the 1980s, then close in the early 2000s. The Musée de l'Ecorché opened in nearby Le Neubourg (Eure, France) with a collection of production tools and models salvaged from the closing factory, and the input of former workers on techniques used.

The personal archives of Dr Louis Auzoux are kept in the French national archives (Archives nationales) under shelf number 242AP. The origins of Auzoux’s teaching model empire, with a special emphasis on his smaller botanical collection is discussed in the essay, “Dr Louis Auzoux and his collection of papier-mâché flowers, fruits and seeds.”

=== Models ===
The Powerhouse Museum (Sydney, Australia) holds a number of his models: including a model of Atropa belladona, and of a dock flower.

== Works and publications ==
- 'Anatomie clastique du Dr Auzoux: tableau synoptique du cheval', Éditeur : l'auteur (Paris), 1845, 1 vol. (52 p.); in-8, disponible sur Gallica.
- 'Leçons élémentaires d'anatomie et de physiologie humaine et comparée' (2e édition), Labé (Paris), J. Dumaine (Paris), 1858, 1 vol. (XV-448 p.); in-8, disponible sur Gallica.
