= Jean-François Ameline =

French physician and professor (1762-1835)

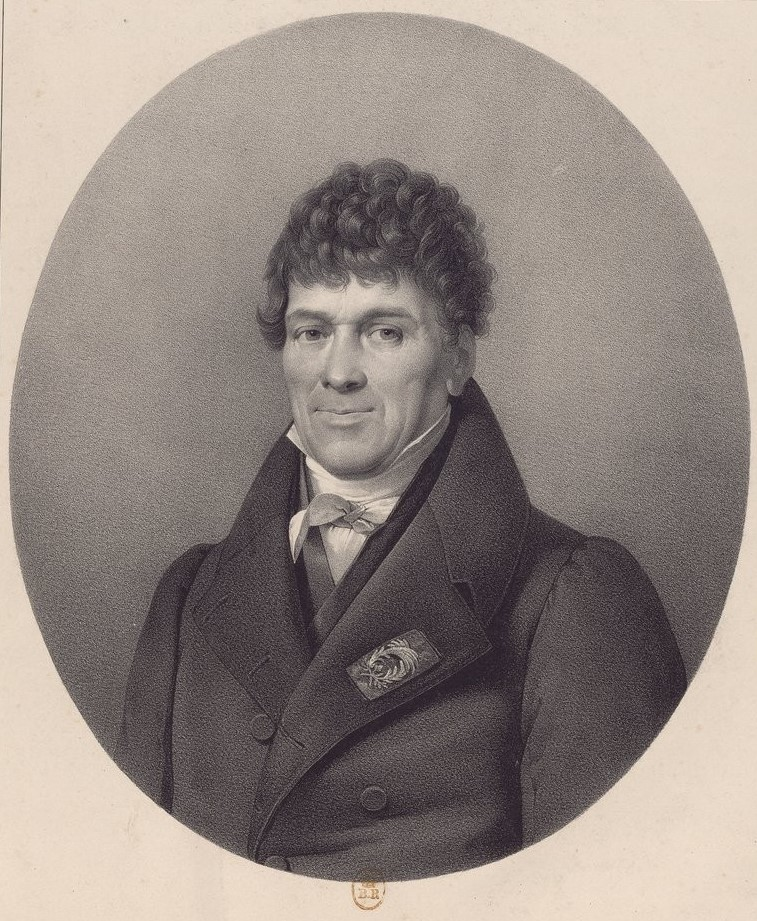
- Portrait of Jean François Ameline
- Born: 28 August 1762; Caen, France
- Died: 3 December 1835 (aged 73); Caen, France
- Occupations: Physician and professor
- Employer: University of Caen Normandy

Jean-François Ameline (Caen, 28 August 1762 – Caen, 3 December 1835) was a French medical doctor and professor at the medical faculty of Caen, and is considered one of the first users of papier-mâché for anatomical models. Before this, beeswax had been used to make anatomical models.

Around 1810, Ameline started making models that were much more robust than the wax ones used at the time. He used papier-mâché to model body parts on a real human skeleton enabling the body to be taken apart as in a dissection, revealing the deeper elements, for example the passage of a nerve or a blood vessel between the muscles, or the proportions of the intestines in the abdomen. The results were spectacular at first sight, but the representation of many of the elements proved inadequate.

From 1816, he presented papers to the medical society of Caen before moving on to the Parisian learned circles, who, from 1819 to 1821, all praised his work but found it rather expensive. A report by the Royal Advisory Council for Public Education in December 1821 described his invention as follows: ‘He uses cardboard to make a solid pulp, light and flexible, and in no way brittle, capable of taking on any shape one wants to give it, and retaining it unchanged without shrinking.’

He waged a lifelong feud with his rival Louis Auzoux, who outdid him with a better idea in 1822, and published numerous articles accusing him of plagiarism. They each used a different technique to make their anatomical models: Ameline used modelling, Auzoux moulding. The latter method was more suitable for large-scale production and volume work, making it cheaper. This controversy lasted until the death of both of them.

== Publications ==
- Mémoire sur l'utilité d'anatomie artificielle chirurgicale (1819, Paris).
- Mémoire sur l'utilité des pièces d'anatomie artificielle chirurgicale (1820, Caen: A. Leroy).
- Observations sur les pièces d'anatomie de M. le Docteur Auzoux (1825). In this book, he comments and criticizes each of the publications written about Auzoux during the presentation of his papers before the various academies. "If Mr. Auzoux is not an inventor, he has so far perfected his model and has so many favorable differences with it, that we may do Mr. Auzoux an injustice by praising Ameline today." (Report of the Société Médicale d'Emulation, 1823, quoted by Ameline himself in this work.)
