= Pascha Johann Friedrich Weitsch =

German painter (1723–1803)

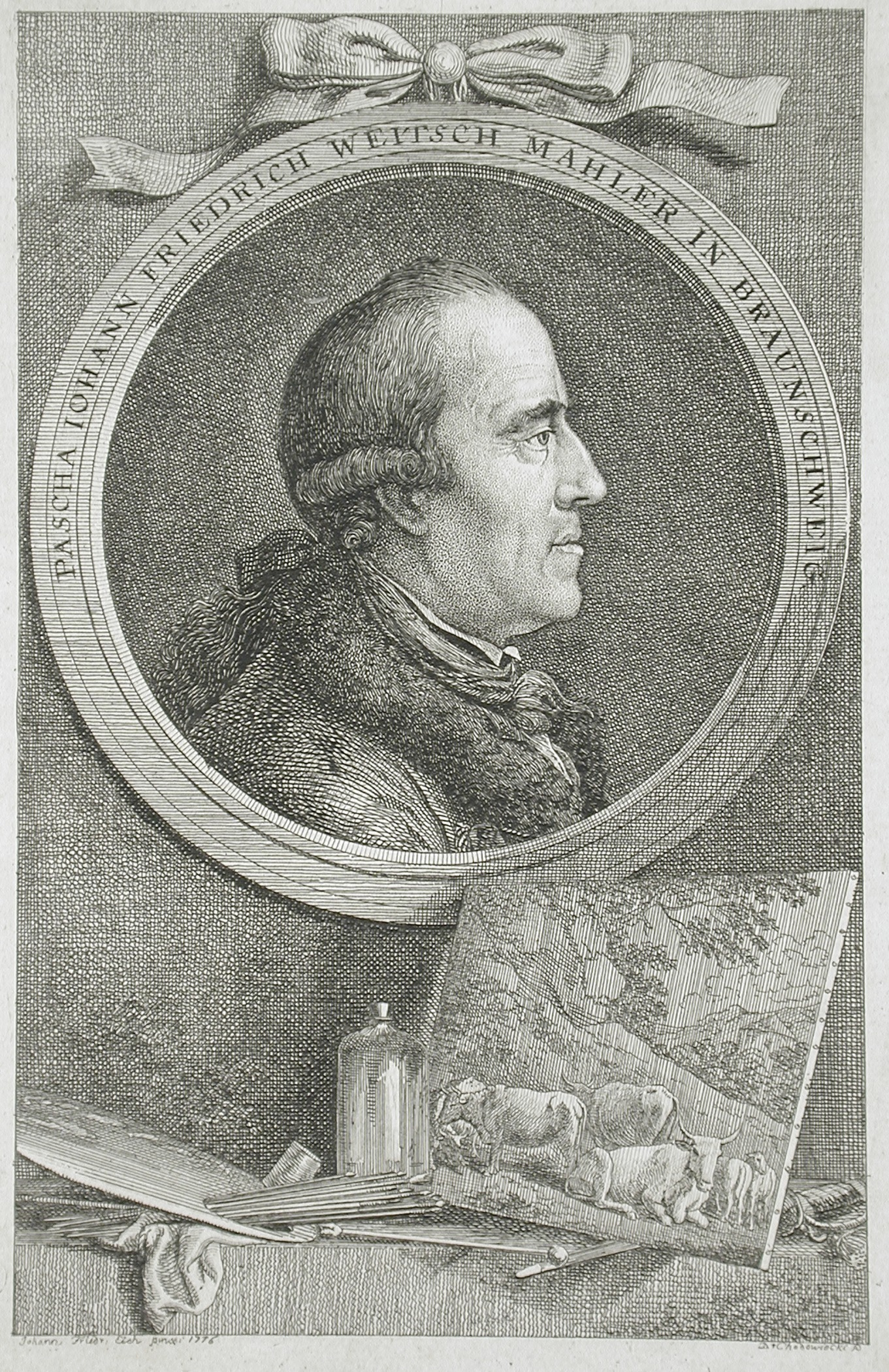
Pascha Johann Friedrich Weitsch; etching by Daniel Chodowiecki (1776)

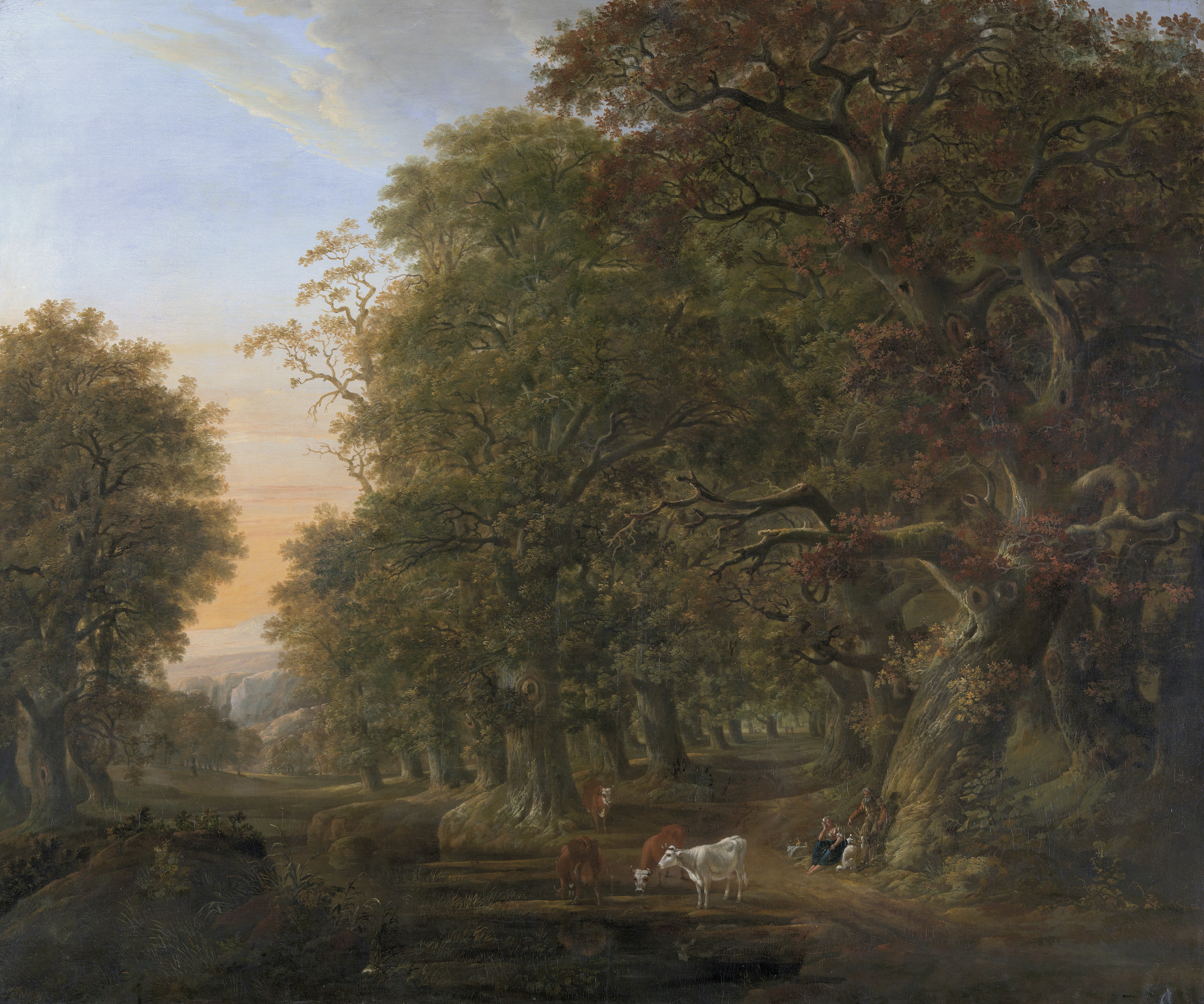
The Oak-woods of Querum (1792)

Pascha Johann Friedrich Weitsch (16 October 1723, Hessendamm, between Hesse and Mattierzoll – 6 August 1803, Salzdahlum) was a German landscape painter and illustrator. His unusual first name was not a nickname derived from the Turkish word "Pasha", as is often stated. It came from his godfather, Pasche Wipperling, and was an abbreviation of "Paschalis".

== Life and work ==
His father, Daniel Weitsche, was a bricklayer. For a short time, he attended the Latin School in Osterwieck, then worked as a clerk in Wolfenbüttel. In 1744, after three years in the service of a Captain named Von Blum, in Braunschweig, he became a soldier.

During his military service, he taught himself how to paint by copying works, possibly at the behest of a commanding officer who learned of his early interest in art. By 1756, he had become skillful enough to obtain a position as a porcelain painter at the Fürstenberg China Factory. In the 1760s, he began to create oil paintings; primarily local landscapes and scenes from the Harz region. In 1780, he and Johann Heinrich Ramberg made a trip through the Harz Mountains, and published an album with 12 views that served to establish his reputation.

He also occasionally worked as an art dealer and, for several decades, was employed by the lacquerware manufacturer, Stobwasser, as a painter and trainer. In 1784, he was named a member of the Kunstakademie Düsseldorf. Five years later, he was appointed "Inspector" (a type of Curator) for the art gallery at Salzdahlum Castle. He became a member of the Prussian Academy of Arts in 1795.

In 1748, he married Anna Stoppen. Their sons, Friedrich Georg Weitsch and Johann Anton August Weitsch, both became painters. Anna died in 1783 and he remarried; to Sophie Helmkampf. In 1803, Johann succeeded his father as Inspector at Salzdahlum Castle.
