= Friedrich Georg Weitsch =

German painter and etcher (1758–1828)

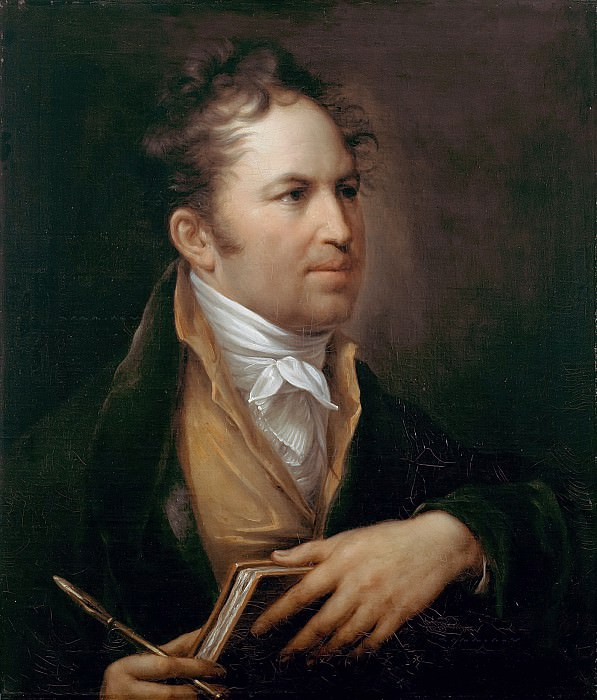
1814 self-portrait of Weitsch

Friedrich Georg Weitsch (8 August 1758 – 30 May 1828) was a German painter and etcher.

== Life and work ==
His father, Pascha Johann Friedrich Weitsch, was a well-known artist. His younger brother, Johann Anton August, also became a painter.

He initially studied with his father. After 1776, he continued his studies with Johann Heinrich Tischbein in Kassel. After studying at the Kunstakademie Düsseldorf with Lambert Krahe, he obtained a position with the lacquerware manufacturer, Stobwasser, where his father was a painting instructor.

From 1784 to 1787, he lived abroad; first in Amsterdam, then in Rome and Florence. Upon returning home, he received an invitation from Charles William Ferdinand, Duke of Brunswick, to work as his court painter. In that capacity, he created numerous portraits of the Duke and his family; both in Braunschweig and at Salzdahlum Castle. His portraits often showed the influence of Anton Graff.

In 1794, he was elected a member of the Prussian Academy of Arts, Berlin, and married Elizabeth Schroeder. The marriage was childless. Following the death of Bernhard Rode, he went to the academy to teach art history. He was named a Rector in 1798. That same year, he was appointed a Royal Court Painter.

His works may be seen at the Herzog Anton Ulrich Museum, the Städtisches Museum, and the Braunschweigisches Landesmuseum.

== Selected paintings ==
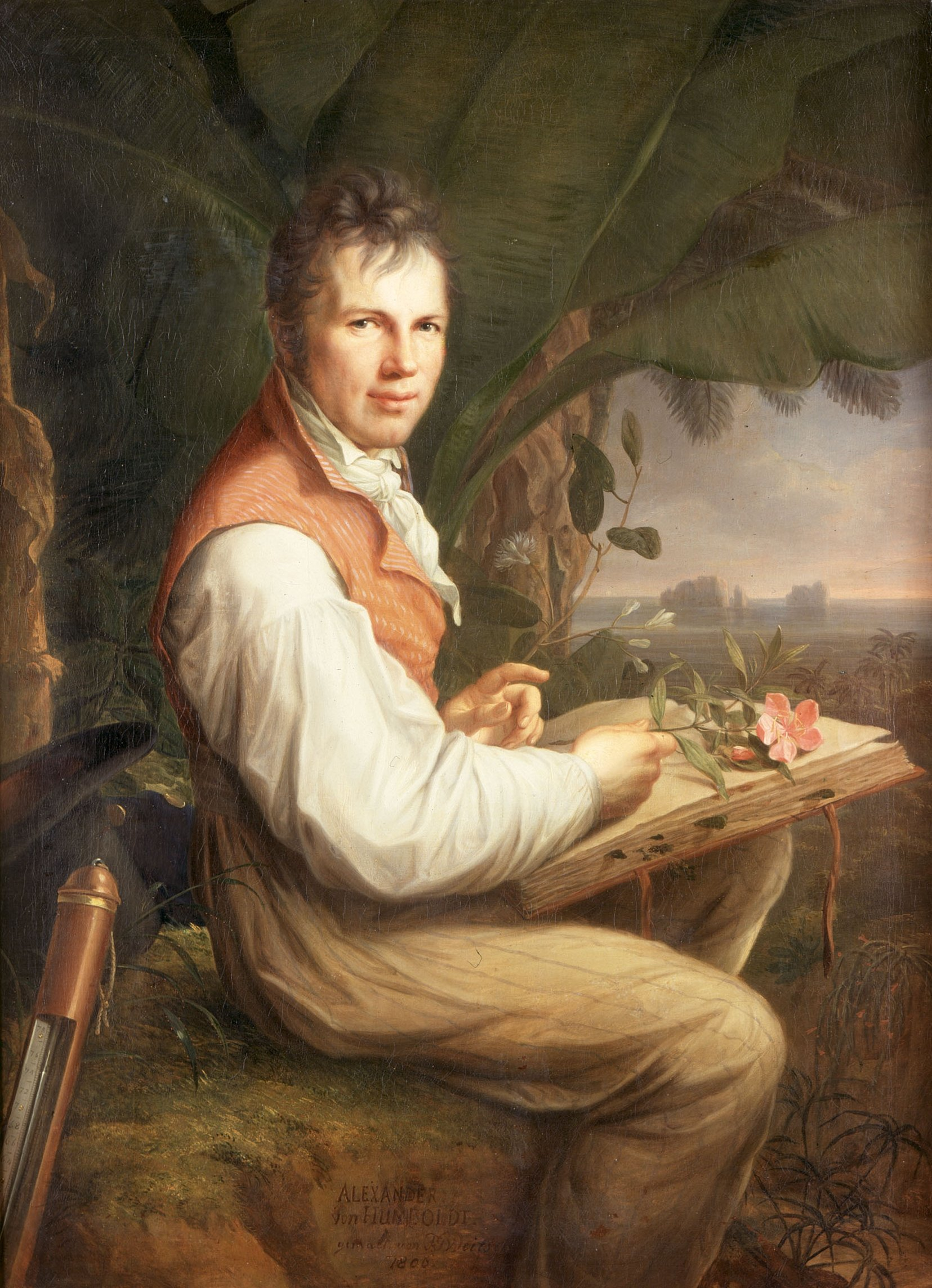
Alexander von Humboldt (1806). Alte Nationalgalerie.

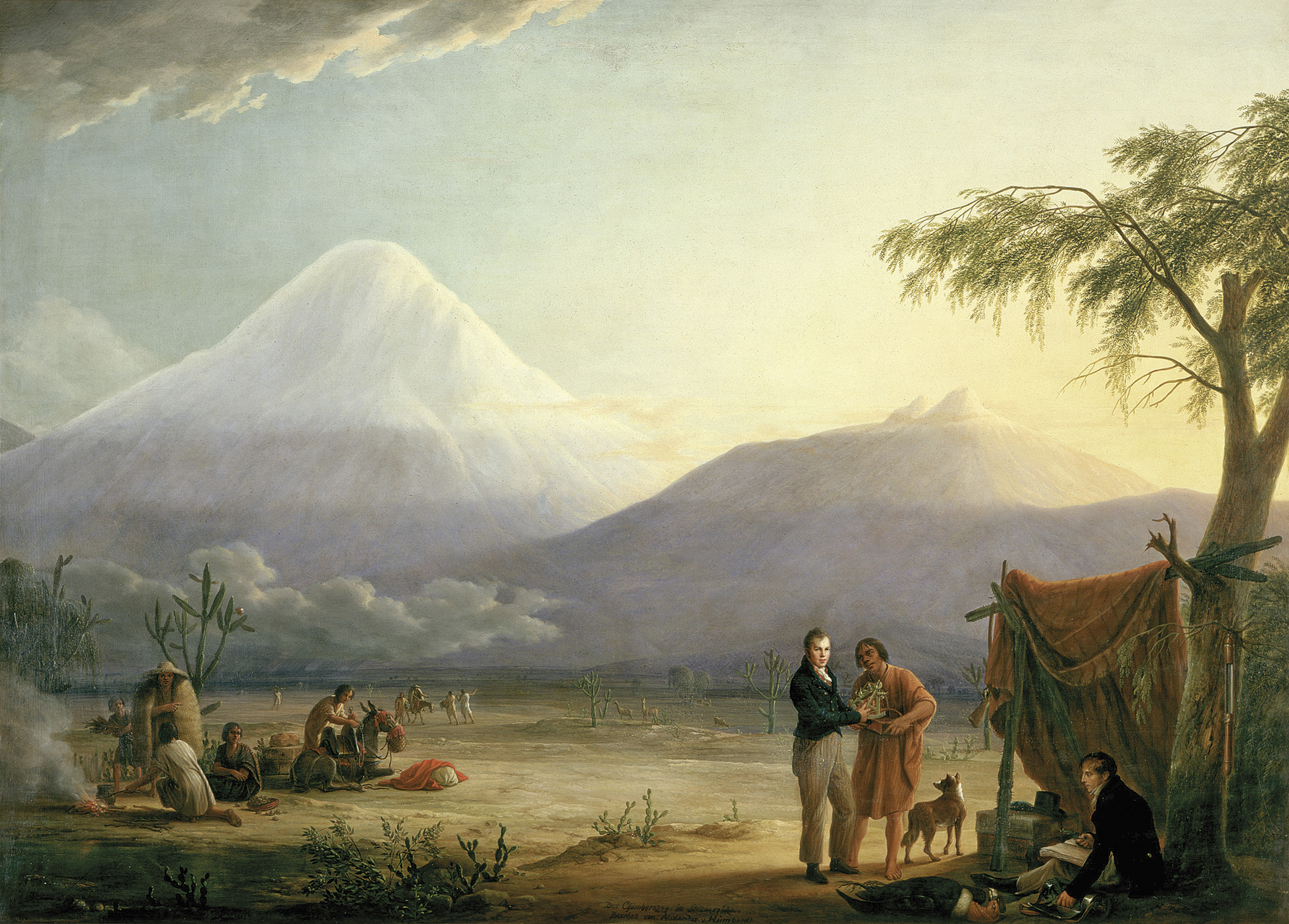
Humboldt and his fellow scientist Aimé Bonpland at the foot of the Chimborazo volcano in Ecuador (imaginary scene, 1810)

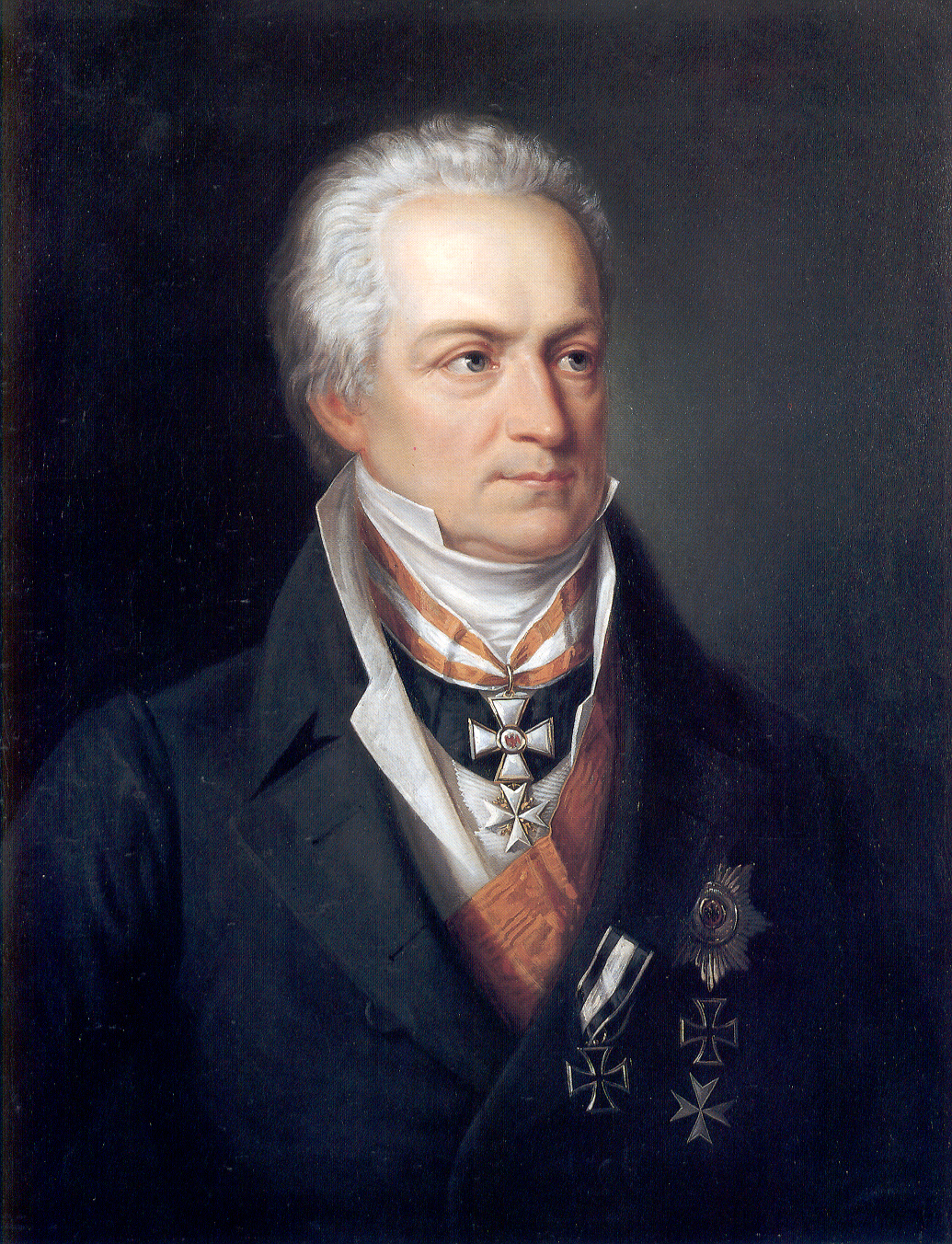
Karl August von Hardenberg (c. 1822)

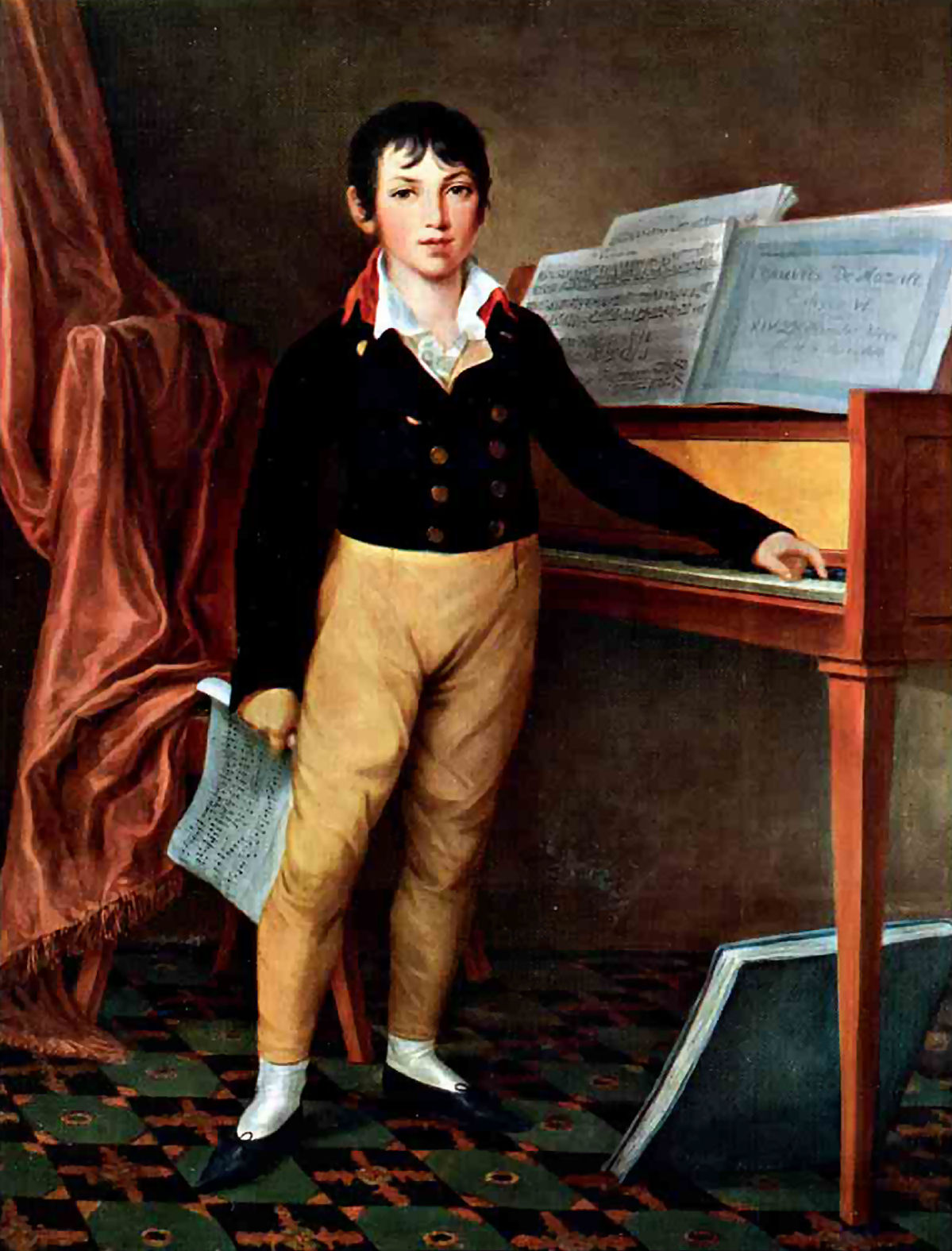
The composer Giacomo Meyerbeer as a boy (1802)

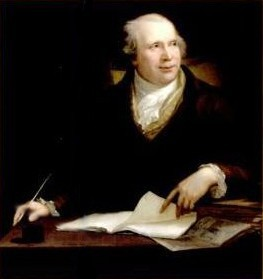
Philosopher and physician, Markus Herz

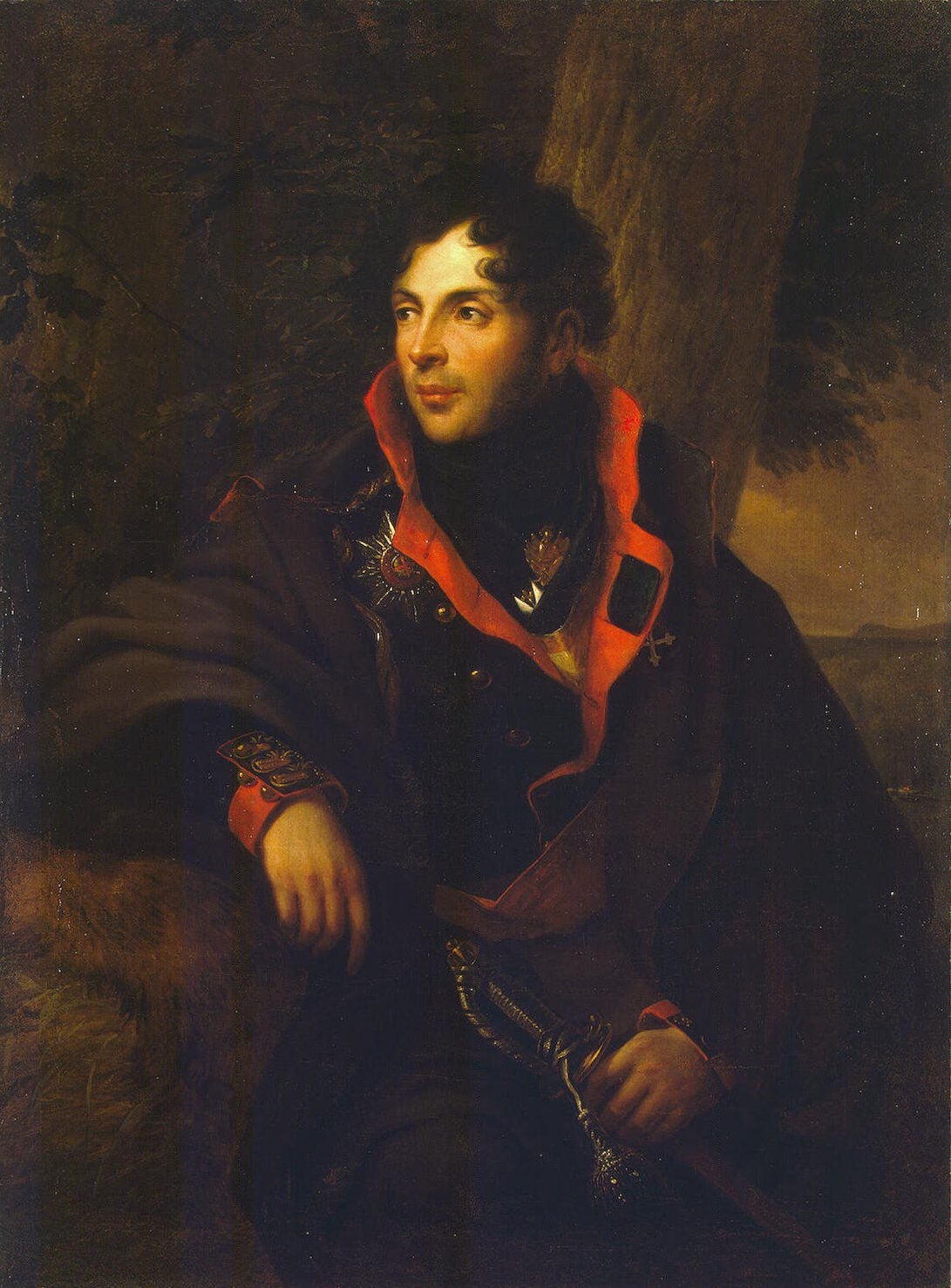
Russian commander Nikolay Kamensky (1810)

== Sources ==
- Paul Zimmermann (1896). "Weitsch, Friedrich" . Allgemeine Deutsche Biographie (in German). Vol. 41. Leipzig: Duncker & Humblot. pp. 629–630.
- Walther G. Oschilewski: "Erinnerung an Friedrich Georg Weitsch. Sein Wirken als Hofmaler und Akademiedirektor in Berlin", in Verein für die Geschichte Berlins, Jahrbuch „Der Bär von Berlin“. #23, Berlin 1978
- Norman-Mathias Pingel: "Weitsch, Friedrich Georg", in Manfred Garzmann, Wolf-Dieter Schuegraf (Eds.): Braunschweiger Stadtlexikon, Joh. Heinr. Meyer Verlag, Braunschweig 1996, ISBN 3-926701-30-7, pg. 136
- Gert-Dieter Ulferts: Weitsch, "Friedrich Georg", in Horst-Rüdiger Jarck, Günter Scheel (Eds.): Braunschweigisches Biographisches Lexikon – 19. und 20. Jahrhundert, Hahnsche Buchhandlung, Hannover 1996, ISBN 3-7752-5838-8, pg. 644.
- Reimar F. Lacher: Friedrich Georg Weitsch (1758–1828). Maler, Kenner, Akademiker. Berlin 2005, ISBN 3-7861-2321-7
