= Ernst Heubach =

- Industry: Manufacturing
- Products: Porcelain-headed bisque dolls

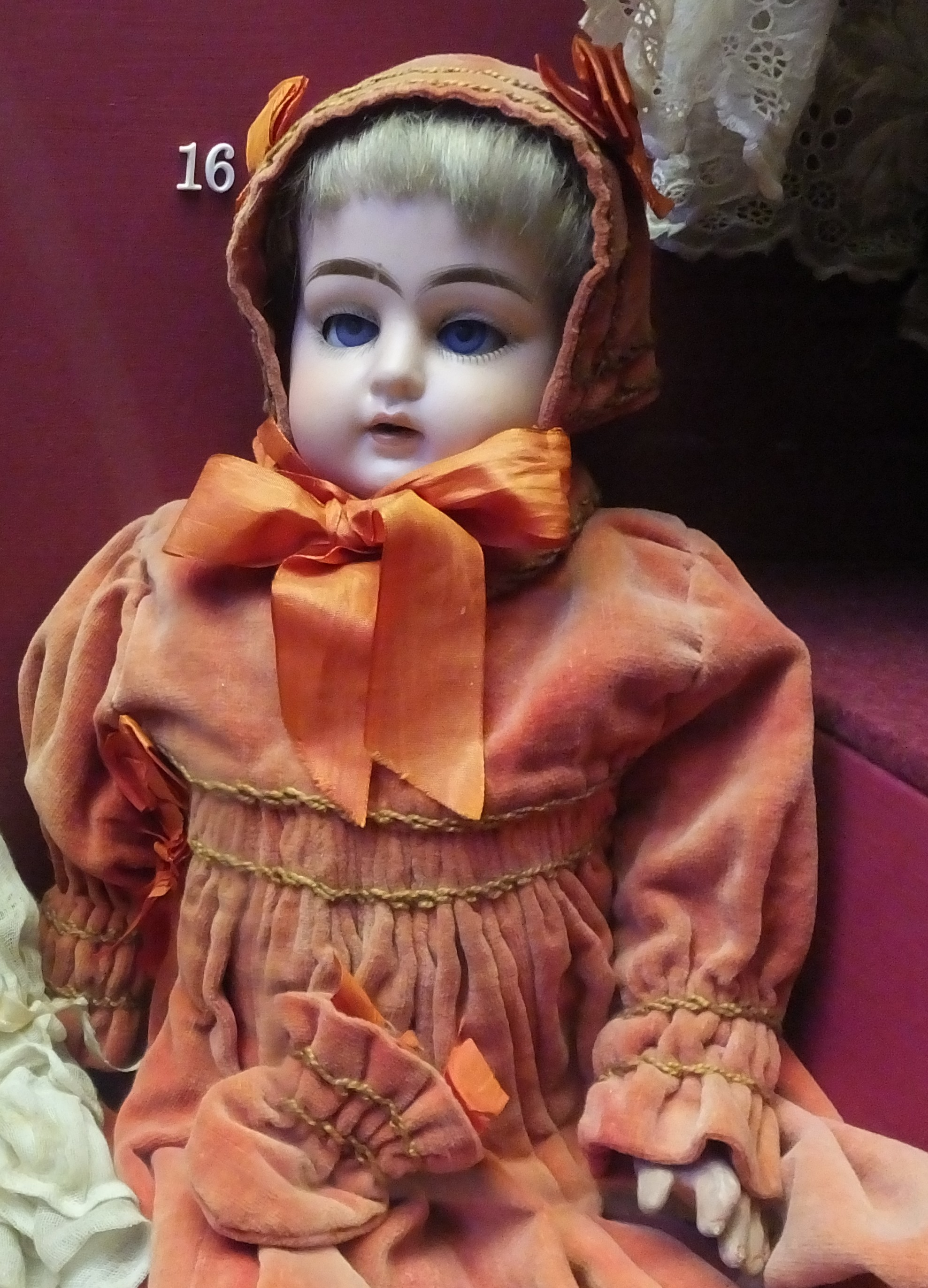
Ernst Heubach bisque headed doll with composition body, in Rochester Guildhall Museum

Ernst Heubach was a company in Köppelsdorf, Thuringia, Germany, that manufactured porcelain-headed bisque dolls from 1885 onwards

== Location ==
Köppelsdorf is a part of Sonneberg, in the Landkreis Sonneberg, in Thuringia 150 km (93 mi) due north of Nuremberg. For fifty years the wooded countryside formed the border between the two Germanys, Sonneberg lying in the GDR. Sonneberg was the centre of the German toy-making industry; it is the home of the German Toy Museum, many doll manufacturers and PIKO model railways.

== History ==
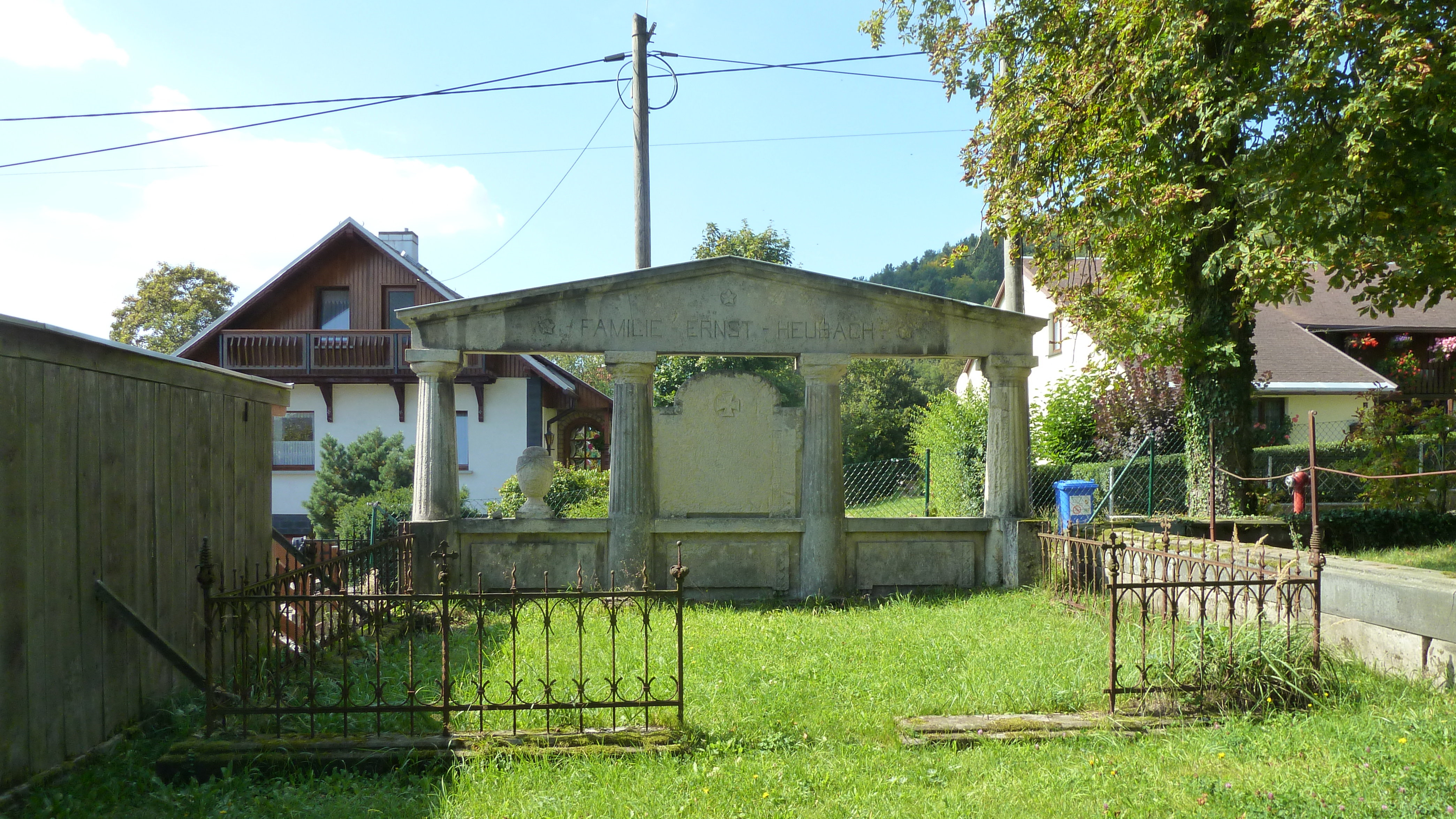
Grave of the family of Ernst Heubach on the cemetery in Köppelsdorf

Gebrüder Heubach of Licht and Sonneberg was a separate firm.

The Ernst Heubach porcelain works opened in 1858 with 50 employees. It traded as Ernst Heubach, Köppelsdorf until 1893, when it became Ernst Heubach, Köppelsdorfer Porzellanfabrik.

Later the firm would manufacture porcelaine for the electrical industry.

In 1915, the founders sons, Ernst and Hans joined the firm, then Hans was killed in the Great War. Beatrice Marseille married Ernst Heubach II. There was thus a family connection between the two firms. Often brothers would do similar jobs in the two firms. A Heubach sculptor had a brother who did the same job at Armand Marseille.

In 1919 the firm merged with Armand Marseille but they separated in 1932. The combined firm was known as the Vereinigte Köppelsdorf Porzellanfabrik vorm. Armand Marseille und Ernst Heubach

== Works ==
The company manufactured bisque heads from moulds for their own dolls and for other doll-makers: Cuno & Otto Dressel (Jutta), Johannes Gottilf Dietich (Igodi), Gebrüder Ohlhaver (Revalo), Seyfarth & Reinhardt (dolls with the SUR mark) and Adolf Wislizenus.

The dolls are stamped with a variety of marks that sometimes contain a horseshoe.

Most of their dolls had closed mouths; dolls tend to be smaller than the dolls of the other manufacturers- the vast majority are under 50 cm tall.

Erst Heubach made a large variety of baby and toddler dolls with mould numbers including, 300, 320, 342 and 399. They produced ethnic character dolls, the Pirat Baby range had mould numbers of 418, 316, 444, 452, 463.

== Examples ==
These dolls are collectables and can be found in many private collections and museums.

== Bibliography ==
- Foulke, Jan (2001). 15th Blue Book Dolls & Values. Grantsville, MD: Hobby House Press. ISBN 0-87588-614-0.
- Van Patten, Denise (2014). "Top Five German Antique Doll Brands". Archived from the original on 24 October 2014.
