= Piko (model trains) =

German model train brand

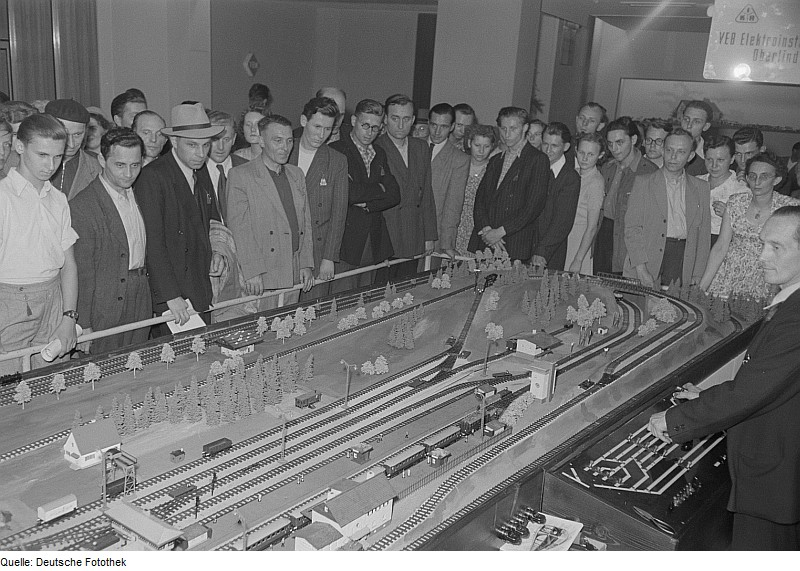
Early PIKO exhibition layout

Piko (stylized PIKO, pronounced "peek-oh") is a German model train brand in Europe that also exports to the United States and other parts of the world.

== History ==
PIKO was founded in 1949 as a state-owned enterprise in the German Democratic Republic (East Germany) to make model trains for Eastern Europe. In 1992, after the reunification of Germany, the company was purchased by PIKO Spielwaren GmbH. PIKO Spielwaren GmbH was founded in April 1992 by Dr. René F. Wilfer, PIKO’s president, who had been working in the toy industry since 1986 and had previously managed a model building company.

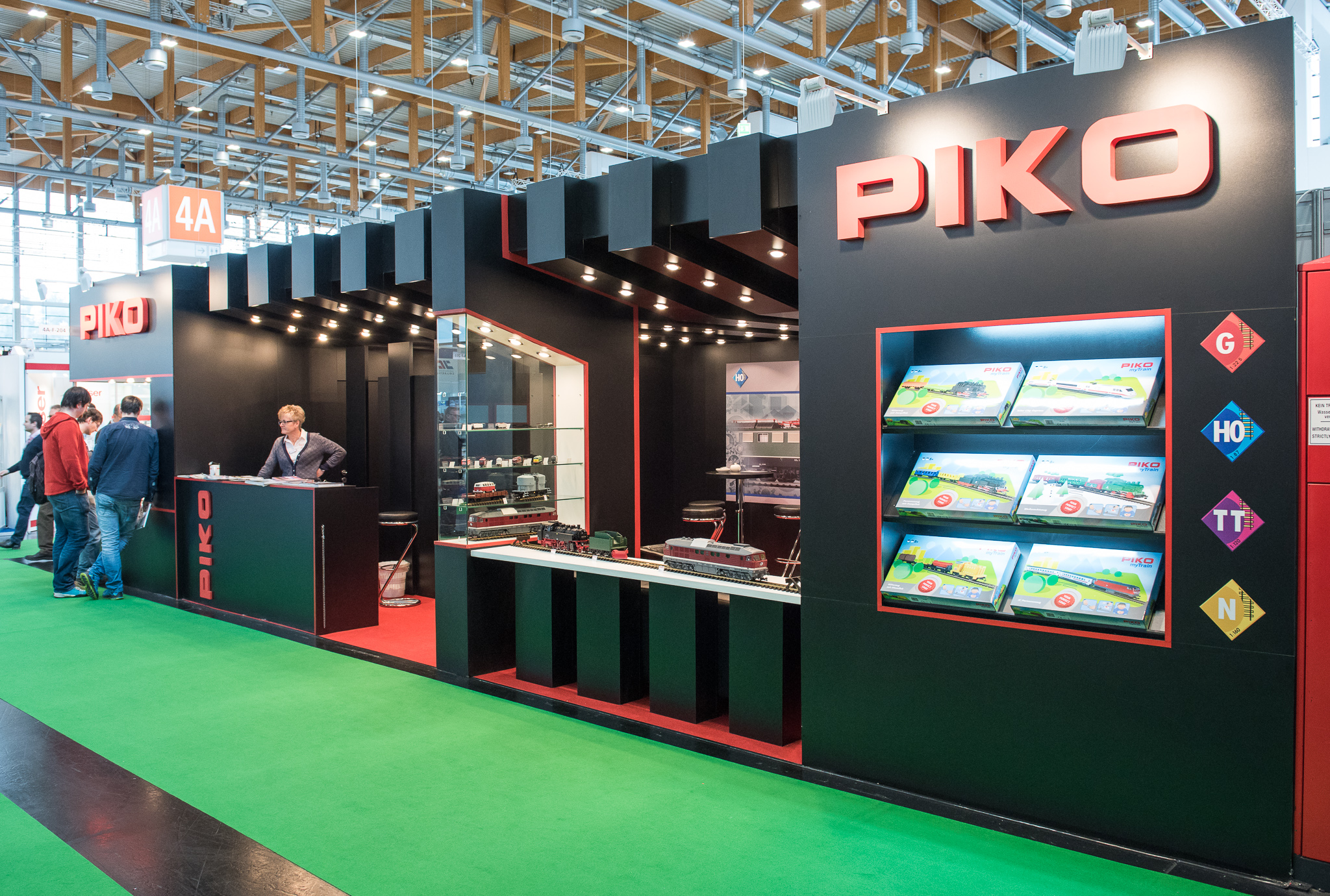
Piko at the International Toy Fair Nuremberg 2016

== Products ==
PIKO manufactures more than 1,500 products in these model train scales:

- G scale: American and European-prototype weather-resistant models for indoor and outdoor use, including starter sets, locomotives, passenger and freight cars, track, buildings, controls and accessories.
- HO scale: European-prototype models including starter sets, locomotives (most in both 2-Rail DC and 3-Rail AC versions), passenger and freight cars, track, buildings, controls and accessories.
- TT scale: European-prototype locomotives and cars.
- N scale: European-prototype locomotives, cars, and buildings.

Its headquarters factory in Sonneberg (Thuringia) Germany makes the G-scale and some HO-scale products, while its PIKO China factory in Chashan, China, makes the HO-scale "Expert", "Hobby", "SmartControl", "SmartControlLight" and "myTrain" lines, as well as the N-scale and TT-scale lines.

== Manufacturing ==
=== Distribution ===
In Germany, PIKO products are distributed from the firm's headquarters in Sonneberg to a network of retailers. In other countries, PIKO distributors and representatives perform a similar function. In America, sales and distribution to retailers is handled by PIKO America in San Diego, California.
