= Franz Körte =

German natural and agricultural scientist

Heinrich Friedrich Franz Körte (17 March 1782 – 30 January 1845) was a German natural and agricultural scientist, and for thirty years Professor of Natural Sciences at the Agricultural Academy in Möglin, which was founded by Albrecht Daniel Thaer.

== Biography ==
=== Family, youth and education ===
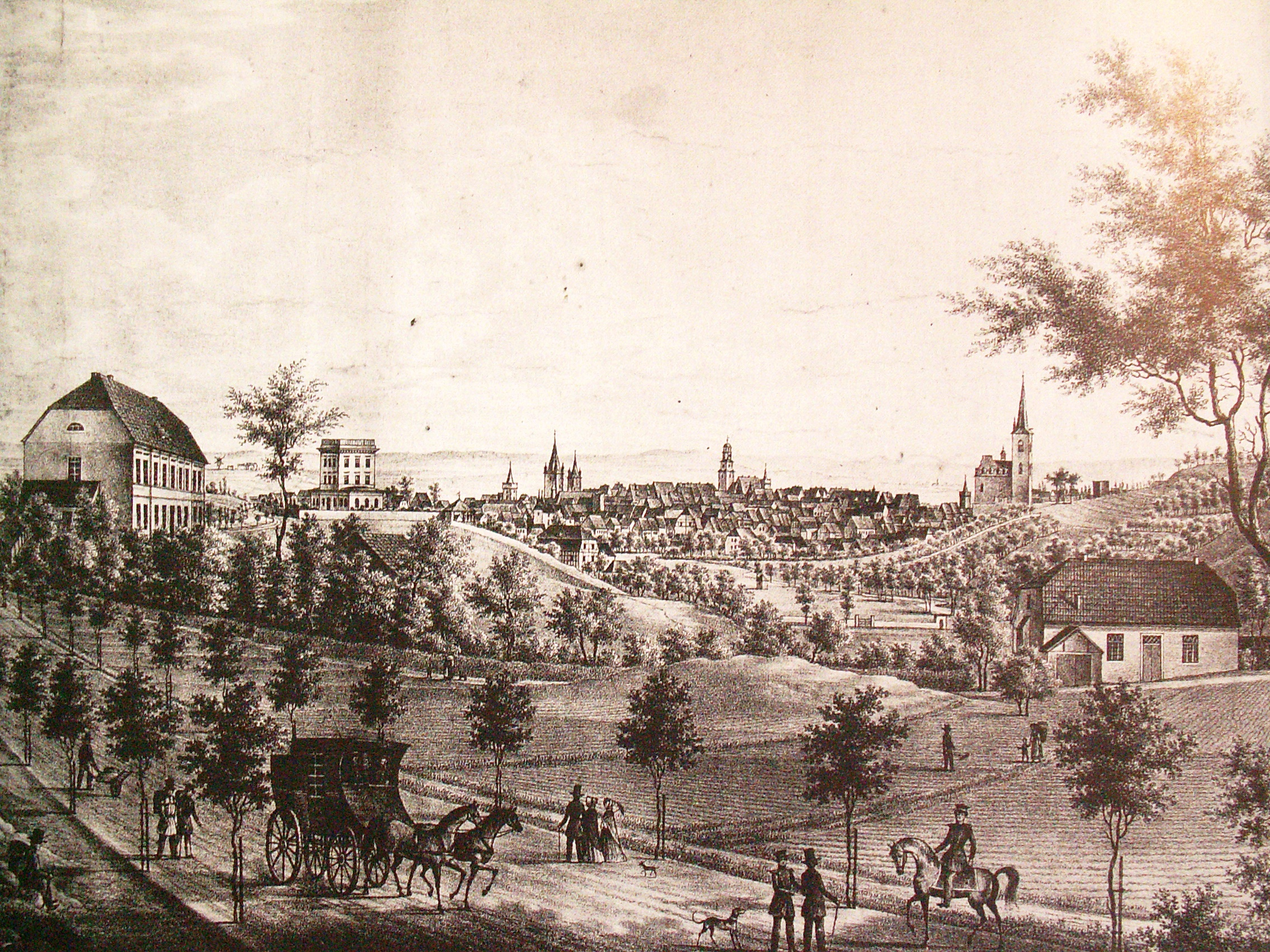
City of Aschersleben.

Franz Körte was born in Aschersleben as the second son of an Evangelical Lutheran preacher. His mother was a niece of the poet Johann Wilhelm Ludwig Gleim. His brother was William Körte (1776–1846), a literary historian and executor of Johann Wilhelm Ludwig Gleim.

Körte received his education in his parental home and at the high school in his native town. Attracted to nature and its operation, he decided to devote himself to study of agricultural economics. Hereby he was influenced by the intellectual movement, which the first writings and teachings of Albrecht Thaer had initiated in the circles of the German agriculturists. In 1802 Körte had visited Thaer in Celle, where Thaer had encouraged him to aim for a scientific study, because this higher qualification would better prepare for the agricultural profession.

To learn more about the agriculture practice, Körte became apprentice to a country estate in Almenhausen (now Kashtanovo) in Kaliningrad Oblast. Also briefly he was agricultural official in an estate in the village of Mennewitz near Aken (Elbe) on the Elbe, where he gained more practical experience into agricultural and management affairs. After solving some financial difficulties with the assistance of Johann Wilhelm Ludwig Gleim, he then moved to the University of Halle. From 1803 to 1804 he devoted himself to the study of natural sciences, particularly botany and chemistry, and under guidance of the botanist Kurt Polycarp Joachim Sprengel familiarized himself with other capacities.

=== Early career at University of Erlangen ===
After he finished his studies in Halle in 1804, the circumstances led him to return in the agricultural practice and to accept a position as husbandry conductor on the estates of Baron von Dressler in Bavaria, but not for long. In 1806 he obtained the position to habilitate as docent at the University of Erlangen, where he turned his scientific research to botany and chemistry.

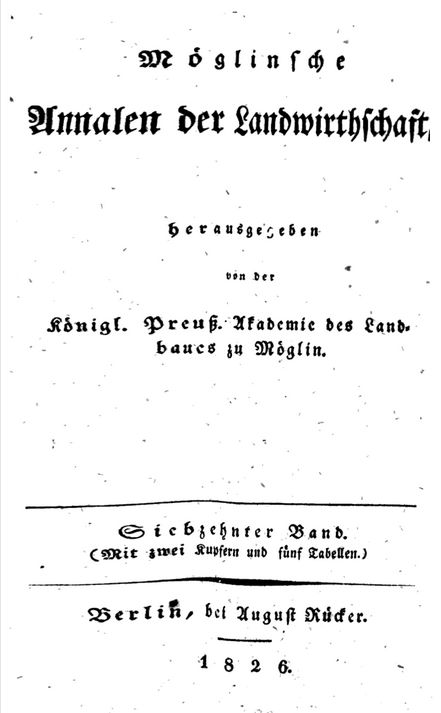
Möglinsche Annalen der Landwirthschaft, Vol. 17, 1826

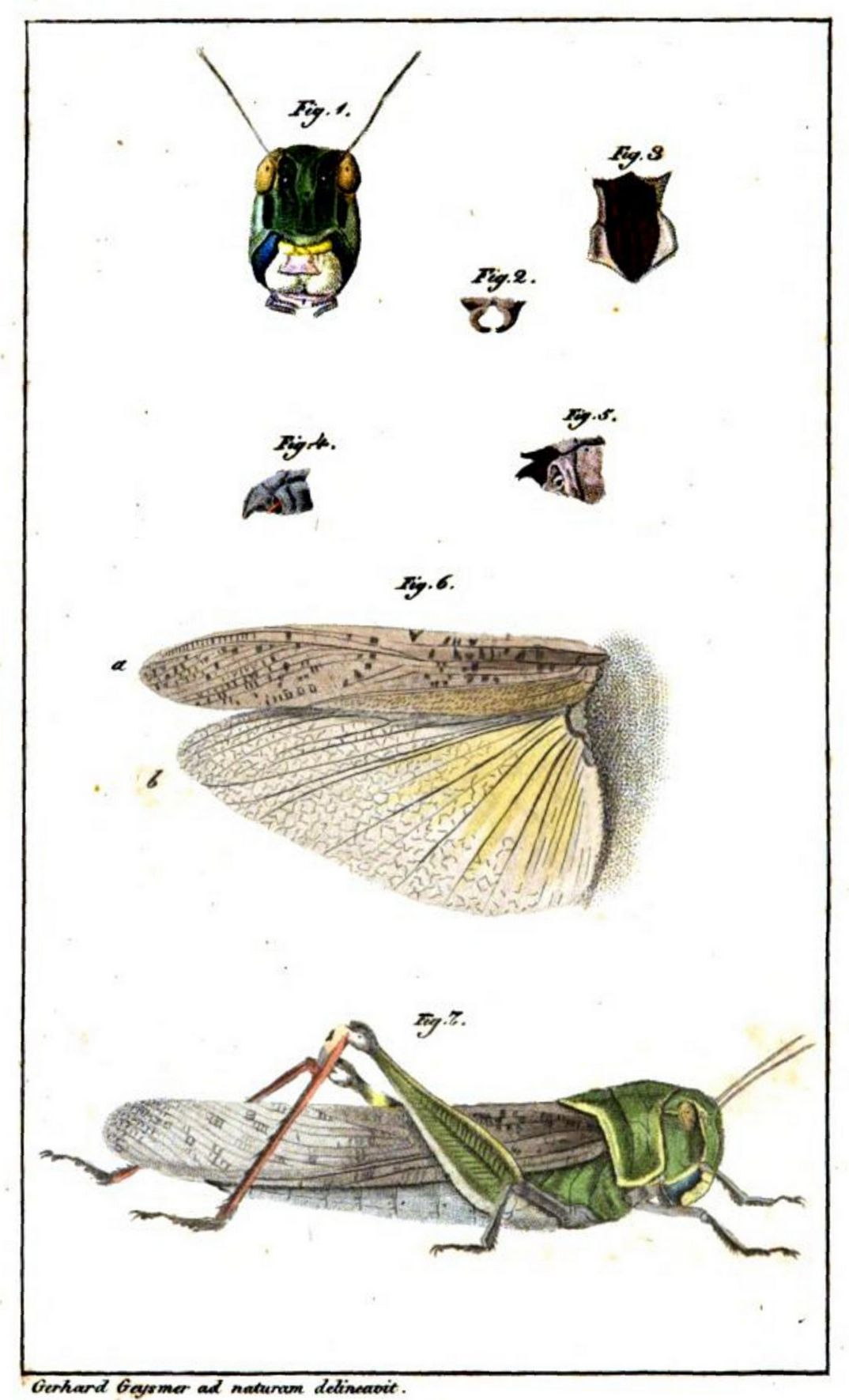
Die Strich-, Zug- oder Wander-Heuschrecke, 1828

His extensive study of the flora of southern Germany in cooperation with Johann Christian Daniel von Schreber resulted in the publication of the Flora Erlangensis in 1811. In the field of chemistry Körte investigated the sulfur springs Wipfeld in 1812, resulting in the publication Untersuchungen der Wippfelder Schwefelquellen (Investigations of Wippfelder sulfur wells).

In the same period Theodor Konrad von Kretschmann, minister of Francis, Duke of Saxe-Coburg-Saalfeld, had asked Körte to take on the organisation of an agricultural/economical teaching institute in Marloffstein in association with the local economy professor Michael Alexander Lips (1779–1838), the Adjunct Director of the Faculty of Philosophy in Erlangen. Under the unfavorable conditions of that time, the company was not able to gain any support and had to be abandoned due to lack of funds. Not discouraged by such failure Körte in 1811 habilitated, and in the same year was appointed lecturer at the University of Würzburg and technical assistant in currency measurements.

=== Professor at the Agricultural Academy Möglin ===
After in 1814 the professorship of Natural Sciences at the Agricultural Academy in Möglin had become vacant, by the death of Professor Georg Ernst Wilhelm Crome, Albrecht Daniel Thaer invited Korte to apply. In autumn 1814 Körte first moved to Berlin, where Thaer lectured at the university. He spend the winter semester 1814/15 giving private lecturers in natural science, and started the research that would lead to the 1818 publication Was ist Humus, wie und auf welche Weise wirkt derselbe als ernährendes Mittel für die Pflanzen? (What is humus, how and in what way does it work the same as a nurturing agent for plants?). By Easter 1815 Körte was installed at the Agricultural Academy in Möglin in Crome's position, awarded with the title of "Royal Prussian Professor". In the same year he married Thaer's daughter Caroline, widow of Georg Ernst Wilhelm Crome.

Körte was a man of excellent educational and organizational skills. In 1818 Thaer made him the director of Mögliner teaching institution, which in 1819 was granted by the Prussian state administration the right to call themselves Königlich Preußische Akademie des Landbaus (Royal Prussian Academy of agriculture). In 1824 Körte took over as editor of the magazine Möglinsche Annalen der Landwirthschaft (Möglinsche annals of agriculture). After his death on 26 October 1828, Thaer had left the estate and institute to Philipp Albrecht Thaer and Franz Körte, who kept running the institute in the same way. In 1830 he handed over the management to his brother-in-law Philipp Albrecht Thaer. In the same year he took over the management of the Lüdersdorf estate, and continued his teaching at the Academy Mögliner he continued.

From 1836 to 1842 Körte published a new magazine as successor of the Möglinschen Annalen, for which he chose the title Möglin'sche Jahrbücher (Möglin'sche yearbooks). Of these at irregular intervals published yearbooks at total was published of five volumes. Korte was an honorary member of several agricultural associations.

Körte was honorary member of many economic and agricultural societies with economic associations. The Prussian king awarded him the Order of the Red Eagle. He died on 30 January 1845 in Lüdersdorf near Wriezen an der Oder and near Reichenow-Möglin.

== Selected publications ==
- Alexander Lips, Franz Körte. Über die Idee von Ackerbauschulen, 1808.
- Johann Christian Daniel von Schreber and Franz Körte Flora Erlangensis: Continens plantas phaenogamas circa Erlangam crescentes. Apud J. J. Palm, 1811.
- Franz Körte. Der Katholikometer: ein ... Instrument für den praktischen Forst- und Landmann, vermöge welchem er alle ... Aufgaben der praktischen Feldmesskunst lösen kann. 1815.
- Franz Körte. Was ist Humus, wie und auf welche Weise wirkt derselbe als ernährendes Mittel für die Pflanzen? 1818.
- Heinrich Friedrich Franz Körte (eds.) Möglinsche Annalen der Landwirthschaft, 1825–1830.
- Johann Friedrich Ludwig Hausmann. Versuch einer geologischen Begründung des Acker- und Forstwesens. Translated from Latin by Franz Körte, 1825.
- Franz Körte. Die Strich-, Zug- oder Wander-Heuschrecke: ihre Beschreibung, Vermehrung in jetzigen und frühern Zeiten, und die Mittel zu ihrer Vertilgung, Rücker, 1828.
- Franz Körte. Chemische Blatter zusammengestellt behufs seiner Vorlesungen Uber den anorganischen Theil der Agriculturchemie. Berlin, 1845

=== About Franz Körte ===
Carl Leisewitz (1882). "Körte, Heinrich Friedrich Franz". Allgemeine Deutsche Biographie (in German). Vol. 16. Leipzig: Duncker & Humblot. pp. 722–724.

- Hans-Heinrich Müller: Mitarbeiter Albrecht Thaers in Möglin. In: Jahresheft der Albrecht-Thaer-Gesellschaft, Bd. 25, 1991, S. 63–74 (m. Bild).
- Friedrich August Schmidt, Bernhard Friedrich Voight Neuer nekrolog der Deutschen, 1847. p. 111
- Störig, Johann Erich Julius: Des Professor Körte Leben und Wirken als Landwirth, Gelehrter und Mensch. In: Allgemeine Landwirthschaftliche Monatsschrift, Bd. 15, 1845, S. 132–139.
