= Albrecht Thaer =

German agronomist (1752–1828)

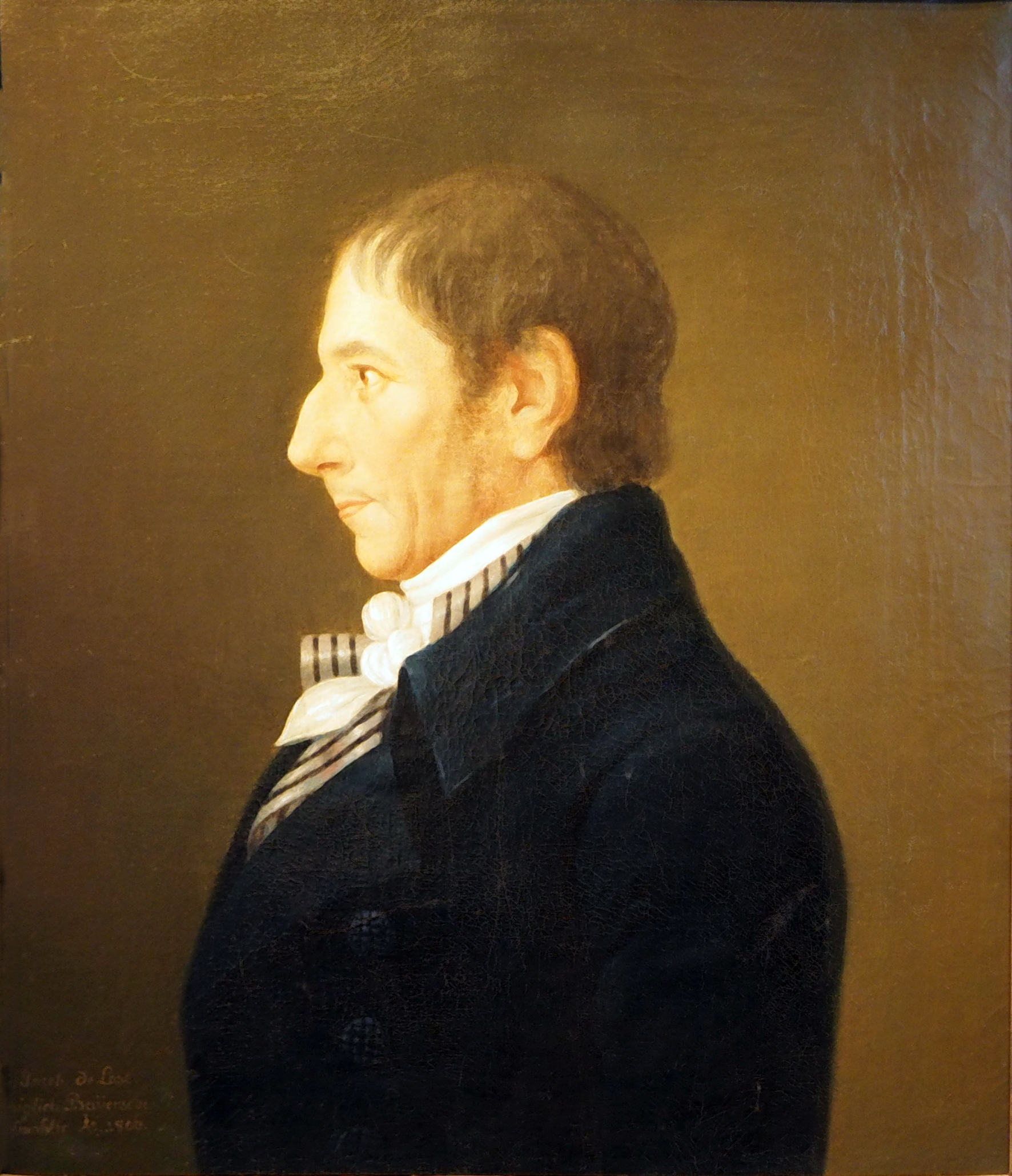
- Albrecht Thaer
- Born: Albrecht Daniel Thaer; 14 May 1752; Celle, Electorate of Hannover, Holy Roman Empire
- Died: 26 October 1828 (aged 76); Wriezen, Kingdom of Prussia
- Education: University of Göttingen
- Known for: Humus theory for plant nutrition
- Spouse: Philippine von Willich (m. 1786)
- Scientific career
- Fields: Agronomy

Albrecht Daniel Thaer (German pronunciation: [tɛːɐ̯]; 14 May 1752 – 26 October 1828) was a German agronomist and a supporter of the humus theory for plant nutrition.

== Early life ==
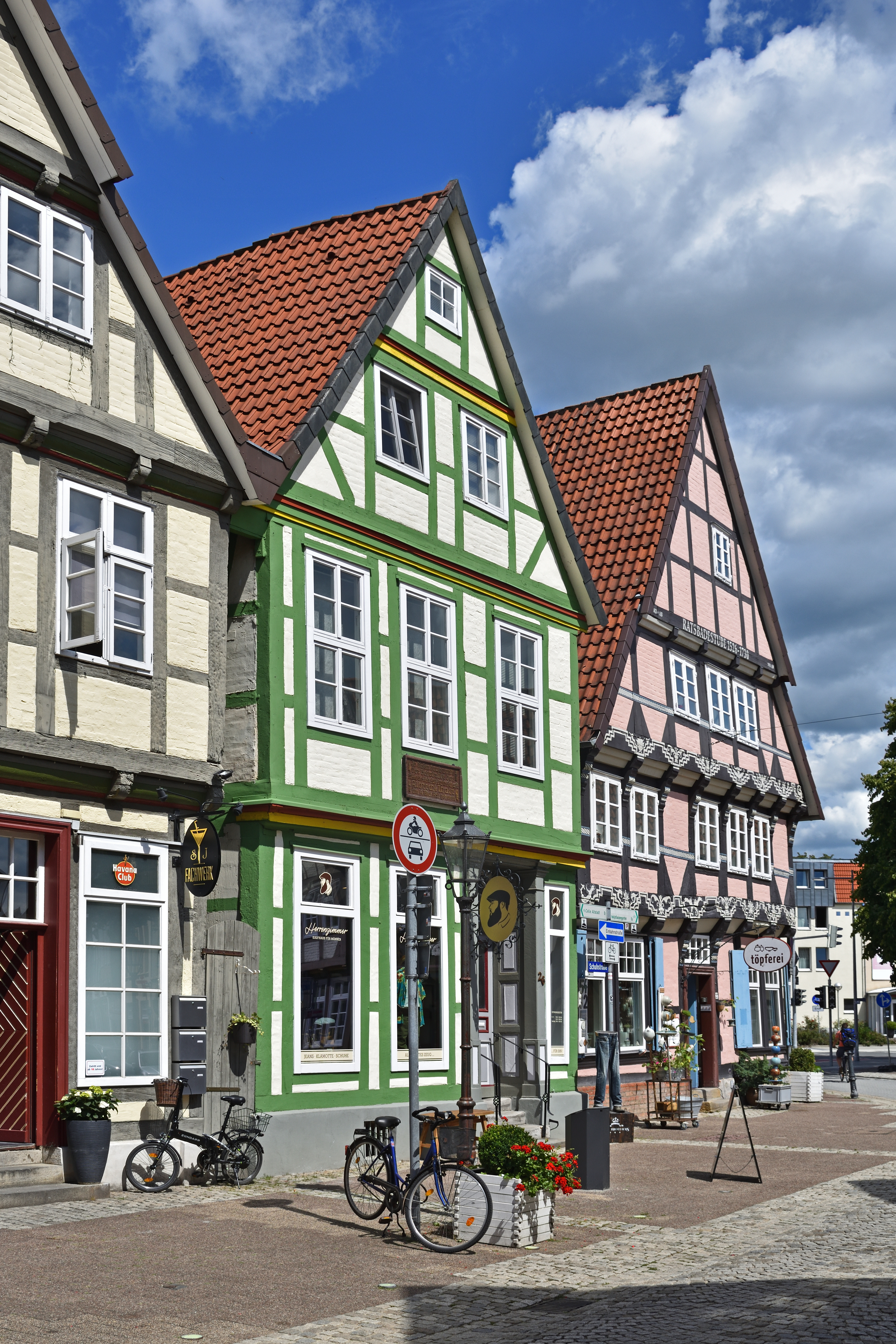
The birth house of Thaer (center)

Albrecht Daniel Thaer was born in Celle, a small town in Hanover in the Holy Roman Empire on 14 May 1752. His father, Johann Friedrich Thaer, was physician to the Court. His mother, Sophie Elisabeth, was the daughter of J. Saffe, receiver of rents and taxes of the district of Celle. Albert was the first born, and had three sisters, Christine, Albertine, and Wilhelmine, of which the first died in infancy, the second was married to Captain Schweppe, and the youngest to a privy councillor named Doctor Jacobi.

At the University of Göttingen he finished his medical studies, and afterwards practised medicine in his hometown. In 1786, he married the daughter of a nobleman, Philippine von Willich.

The garden attached to his house, where he amused himself with cultivating flowers, gave rise to his agricultural celebrity; the taste for the culture of flowers led him gradually to that of agriculture; he bought a larger lot of sixteen acres to use as a large garden containing rare species of plants, flowers, and various kinds of grasses. His success in the culture of various plants, stimulated him to buy a more extensive tract of land.

== Career ==
=== Physician ===
About that time, just when he was at the point of giving up his profession and devoting his time to agriculture alone, he received from London his patent, as physician to George III. This honor came unexpectedly, and he could not withdraw himself at once from his profession, but began by degrees to resign his practice, and continued his favorite occupation, the improvement of agriculture, with the view of establishing an experimental farm. He paid great attention to the culture of herbage fodder, root crops, and potatoes.

=== Agriculturist ===
His work on English husbandry appeared soon after, and was well received in Germany and in England. His fame as an agriculturist who applied science to practice, spread over all Europe. His plan of establishing a school was at last executed, and attracted many visitors of distinction. The king of Prussia Frederick William III was exceedingly anxious to have Thaer's services, invited him to reside within his kingdom, and granted him the following advantages:

1. Nomination as a member of the Academy of Sciences;
2. A grant of four hundred acres of land;
3. The privilege of selling the land, and all the privileges attached to a landed estate belonging to a nobleman, in case he should buy another estate;
4. Protection to his academy;
5. Entire liberty of the press in regard to his Agricultural Journal;
6. Permission to practice his profession as a physician;
7. His nomination, as privy counsellor.

These privileges and honors were too tempting. He accepted the king's offer, and left Celle for Berlin; took possession of the 400 acres; sold it immediately, and bought the present landed estates Moegelin, and obtained all the privileges of a nobleman.

It was in June, 1804, that he took possession of Moegelin. The loss of his flocks by rot and the French wars, were great calamities, especially in the commencement of his operations; but he conquered all difficulties by perseverance; and in 1806 the academy was opened. Twenty pupils inscribed their names immediately; the number increased with every year. He distinguished himself in the improvement of wool; his flocks were superior to any in Prussia. His written works increased his fame, and the sovereigns of Russia, Prussia and many others sent him their orders of knighthood. He purchased additional property for his younger son Albrecht Philipp Thaer, the later proprietor of Moegelin, who was entirely devoted to agricultural pursuits.

== Death ==
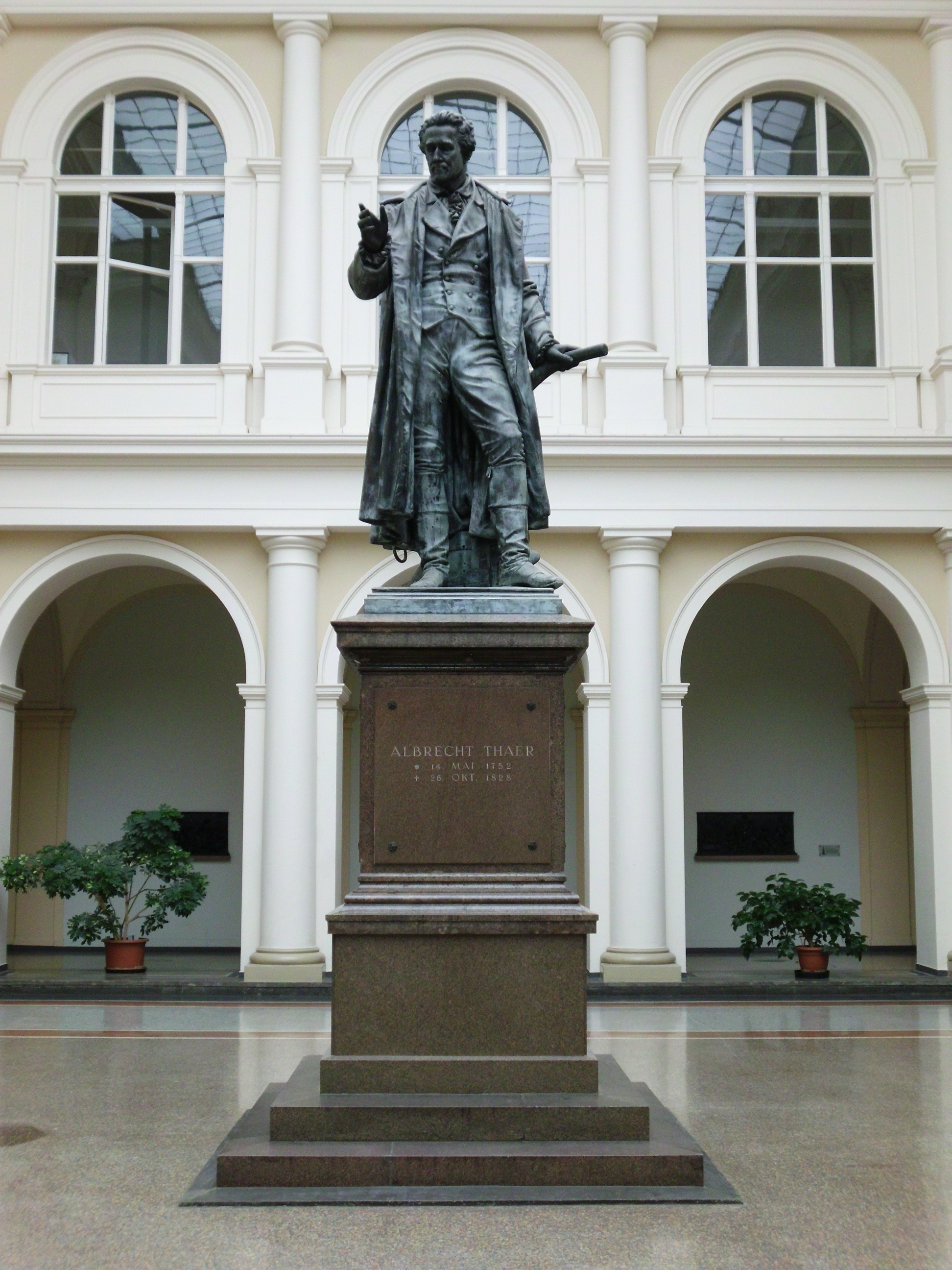
Original Thaer monument in the Agricultural faculty of Berlin.

In the year 1828, he had a severe attack of rheumatism, and his health began to decline; in 1827, his eyesight failed entirely. His sufferings were great, but he bore them with fortitude and resignation, and at last, on 28 October 1828 in Wriezen, death put an end to his pains.

Thaer is buried beside his consort, among the trees he planted in his garden, opposite their home, on the shore of a pond under the eaves of a chapel. His grave is marked by a pyramid.

Today, there is a grave memorial in Möglin in Brandenburg, Germany.

== Work ==
Albrecht Thaer was the first Agricultural scientist, who arranged the existing facts and theory of agriculture in a proper system. His works are highly valued among all agriculturists, and in his time referred to as a magazine of solid truths.

=== Thaer's Agricultural School ===
The Albrecht-Thaer-Schule in Celle was founded by Thaer early 19th century. In 1802 Thaer had founded in Celle in the "Dammasch-Wiesen", the first German Agricultural Training Institute (today Thaer's Garden ). There among others he experimented with rotation to improve the yield. In 1804, he joined the Prussian service. In the same year he founded the first German Agricultural Academy (Agricultural Academy Möglin) in Möglin manor house. In 1819 the academy was renamed Royal Prussian Academy of agriculture. Among the professors were Georg Ernst Wilhelm Crome from 1808 until 1813, Franz Körte from 1814 to 1830, and Philipp Albrecht Thaer from 1830 until its inclusion in the Berlin Agricultural Training Institute in 1861.

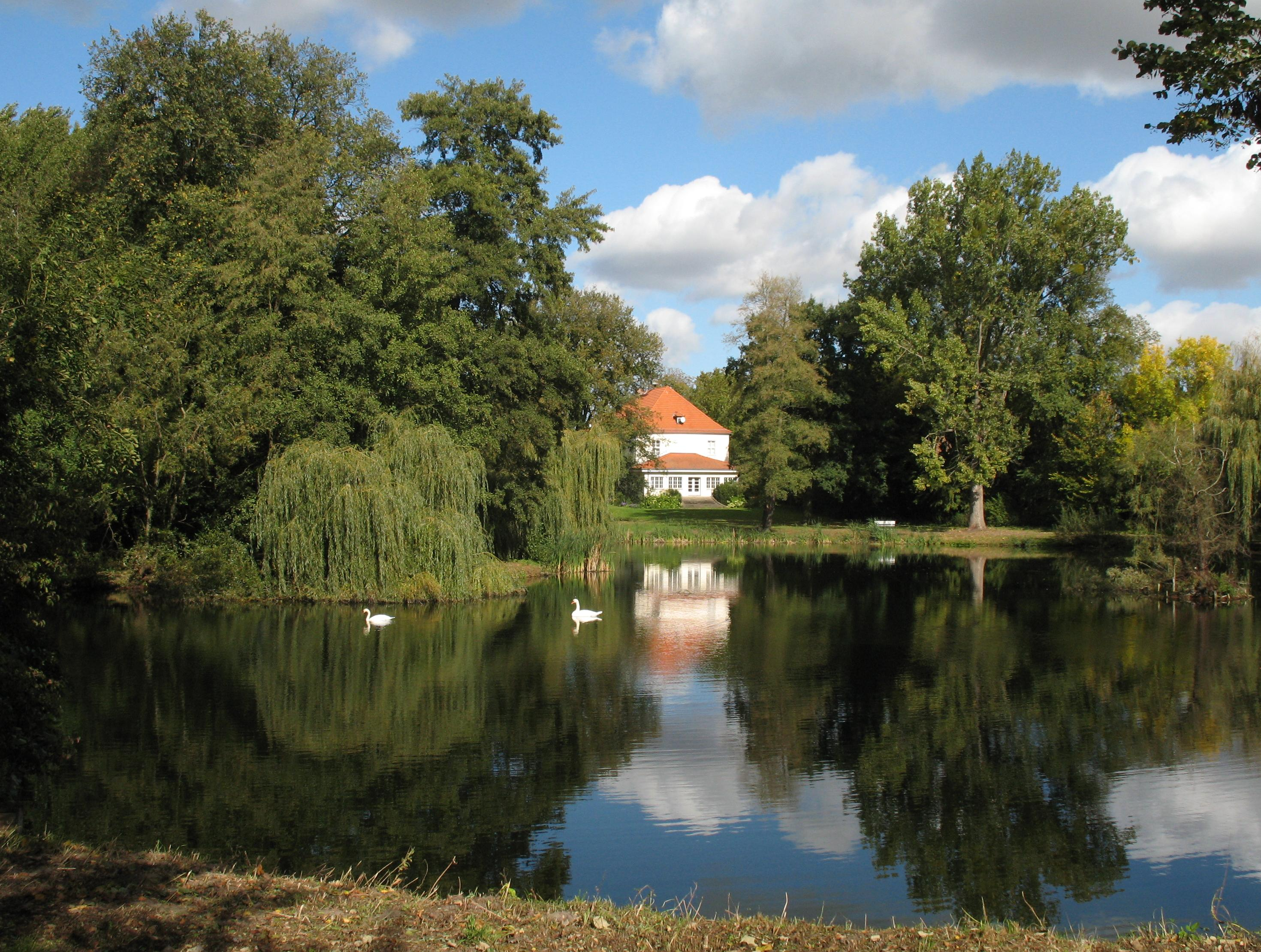
Park and manor house in Möglin in Brandenburg, Germany

In the year 1804, the King of Prussia had invited Thaer to settle in his dominions, and gave him the estate of Mogelin, situated about forty-five miles from Berlin, consisting of 1,200 acres, to manage as a pattern farm. He erected extensive buildings for himself, three professors, a variety of tradesmen, and the requisite agricultural buildings. The three professors were — one for Mathematics, Chemistry and Geology, one for Veterinary Knowledge, and a third for Botany and Entomology; an experienced agriculturist was also engaged, whose office it was to point out to the pupils the mode of applying the sciences to the practical business of husbandry.

The course commerced in September. During the winter months, the time is occupied in mathematics, and the first six books of Euclid were studied: and in the summer, the geometrical knowledge was practically applied to the measurement of land, timber, buildings, and other objects. The first principles of chemistry were unfolded. By a good but economical apparatus, various experiments were made, both on a large and small scale. For the larger experiments, the brew-house and stilLhouse with their respective fixtures were found highly useful.

Much attention was paid to the analysation of various soils, and the different kinds, with the relative quantity of their component parts, were arranged with great order and regularity. The classification was made with neatness, by having the specimens of soil arranged in order, and distinguished by different colours. Thus, for instance, if the basis of the soil is sandy, the glass has a cover of yellow paper; if the next predominating earth is calcareous, the glass has a white ticket on its side; if it was red clay, it had a red ticket; if blue clay, a blue one. Over these tickets, others, of a smaller size, indicate by their colour the third greatest quantity of the particular substance contained in the soil. This matter may appear to many more ingenious than useful, and savouring too much of the German habit of generalising. The classification of Von Thaer was, however, as much adopted, and as commonly used on the large estates in Germany, where exact statistical accounts were kept, as the classification of Linnaeus in natural history is throughout the civilised world.

There was a large botanic garden, arranged on the system of the Swedish naturalist, kept in excellent order, with all the plants labelled, and the Latin as well as German names. A herbarium, with a good collection of dried plants which was constantly increasing, was open to the examination of the pupils, as well as skeletons of the different animals, and casts of their several parts, which must have been of great use in veterinary pursuits. Models of agricultural implements, especially of ploughs, were preserved in a museum, which was stored as well with such as were common in Germany, as with those used in England, or other countries.

The various implements used on the farm were all made by smiths, wheelers, and carpenters, residing round the institution; the workshops were open to the pupils, and they were encouraged by attentive inspection, to become masters of the more minute branches of the economy of an estate.

The sum paid by each pupil was four hundred rix-dollars annually, besides which they provide their own beds and breakfasts. In that time in that country, such an expense precluded the admission of all but youths of good fortune. Each has a separate apartment. They were very well behaved young men, and their conduct to each other, and to the professors, was polite, even to punctilio.

=== Principles of Agriculture, 1809–12 ===
Thaer's most quoted book is the four volumes Grundsätze der rationellen Landwirthschaft (1809–1812), which was translated into English in 1844 as The Principles of Agriculture by William Shaw and Cuthbert W. Johnson. The humus theory described in this work still received acceptance in the Modern Period (1800–1860).

Von Thaer's "Principles of Agriculture" contain the result of his experience through a series of years. The work embraces the theory of the soil, the clearing of land, plowing, manuring, and irrigation, hedges and fences, management of meadow and pasture lands; the cultivation of wheat, rye, corn, oats, barley, buckwheat, hops, tobacco, clover, and all the varieties of grasses; the economy of kine stock, breeding and feeding; the management of the dairy, and the use of manures, and the various systems of cultivation, keeping journals and farm records. In brief, it is a complete cyclopedia or circle of practical agriculture.

=== Conception of the agriculturist ===
Von Thaer's Agricultural School, Philipp Albrecht Thaer acknowledge in the 1850 programme of his agricultural school, that the object of his institution is to educate capable superintendents, or directors for large estates: but that he cannot call anyone a capable director, who has only the skill to carry out a mode of farming in an imitation or borrowed manner: that he understands by a capable director, a man who can, with a clear discernment, enhance the value of a landed estate entrusted to him so far as circumstances of condition and situation allow it.

An effective director sets a clear and profitable objective with careful consideration of both internal and external factors. With skill and insight, they advance steadily, step by step, towards achieving high levels of culture and productivity. It is obvious that in this process, any unnecessary schemes or transitions should be avoided.

But if we now enquire further, as to the material and elements which are considered necessary to educate anyone to such a capacity, it is needful first—that the agriculturist should understand the general rudiments of all industrial intercourse and those also which belong to the general economy of the state; and these so much the more, as he will always be dependent upon the same. He is obliged, therefore, to fit himself to discern how his own landed estate is related to the whole country; how its politico-social relations and the conjectures of trade may check or aid, operate favorably or disastrously upon his enterprises and their results. Hence he can easily learn to judge, also, how the particular situation of a farm, the nearness or distance of the market, the thoroughfares of trade, the exchange of manufactures, and the present value of money represented by the rate of interest, and, also, by that of the productiveness of mercantile or industrial capital, may impart a greater or less value to his landed property. These will, therefore, be particularly considered, in the exposition of the general doctrine of trade, which treats of the value of capital, the price of products, and the cost of labor.

While thus the agriculturist is led, as it were, from without to the internal economy of landed property, he must further-be so prepared, that he can judge not only of the soil on the same, and the materials contained in it, but also the given degree of richness, and the fit culture. It cannot also escape him, what influences the circumstances of the region exert on vegetable and animal development; and still less ought he to be unacquainted with the physical and moral circumstances of the inhabitants of a country under his inspection and examination.

To look through this system correctly and regulate it, the agriculturist needs only the aid of a properly arranged and carefully executed' mode of keeping accounts: for as, according to the expression of Thaer the elder, "Account-keeping is the A B C of every trade," so it is wholly and especially the alphabet of agricultural enterprise. Through it, only, the results obtained have a certainty, the relation of the various branches to the whole are represented by numbers; the cause and effect, the means and result, the deficiency and the surplus, are reduced to figures and expressed in money-value.

As the agriculturist is, and continues in an always progressive intercourse with nature and its life; so those scenes are of aid to him, which give him an insight into the powers of nature, its influence on the success or failure of agricultural enterprise, the facility of developing these powers and influences of nature so as to regulate them according to his own wishes as far as it can be done. Hence, it follows, that the knowledge drawn from the domain of the natural sciences ought not to be wanting, in the complete education of. the future director: [steward, or manager, or overseer, as we call him in this country.] As it has been shown how the material and elements must act together, to educate a thorough and an able agriculturist it seems to us, also, that we have, at the same time, shown that while we have in view, as the immediate object of our school, this forming of thorough farmers, we must not limit the object within a narrow space; but make the training which accomplishes the general purpose, such as will enable a young man of a good preliminary education, sound parts and due application, to search still farther and acquire a high degree of information in this trade and science, by books and words.

== Commemoration ==
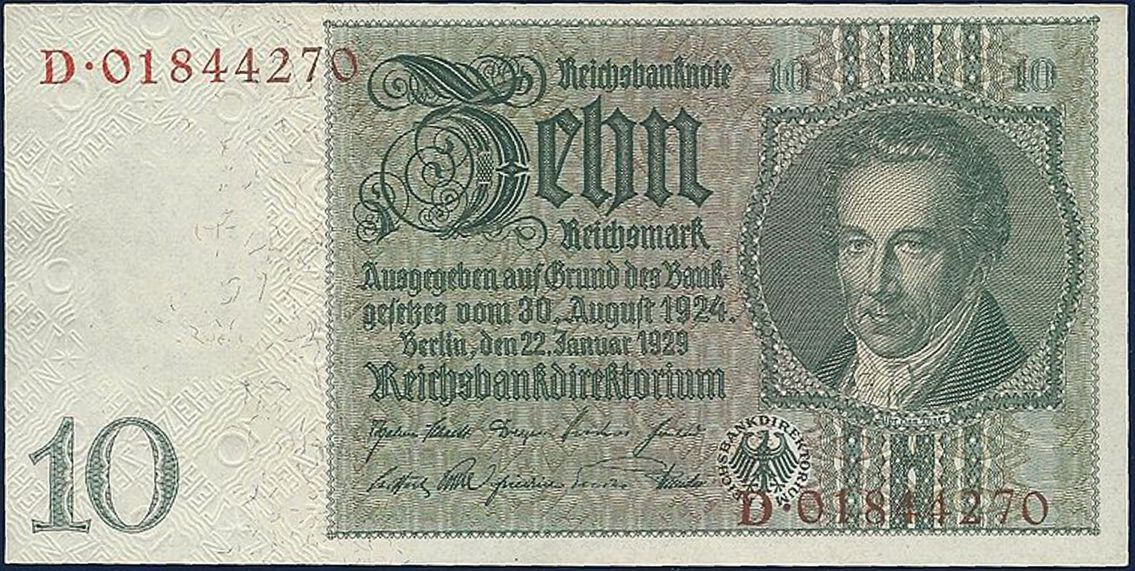
Banknote of 10 Reichsmark, 1929

There are memorials to Thaer in Leipzig, Berlin (Schinkelplatz), Celle, Halle, Möglin, and Kadaň (in front of the agriculture school).

His portrait appeared on the 10 ℛ︁ℳ︁ banknote issued by the Reichsbank from 1929 until 1945. Printing ceased in 1945 but the note remained in circulation until the issue of the Deutsche Mark on 21 June 1948.

A postage stamp in memory of Thaer was issued by East Germany(DDR) Feb. 8, 1977. At the occasion of his 250th birthday, Germany issued a postage stamp and a postal stationery envelope on May 5, 2002.

== Selected publications ==
Original publications in German, a selection:

- Johann F. Mayer, Albrecht Daniel Thaer (1800). Über die Anlage der Schwemm-Wiesen
- Albrecht Daniel Thaer (1800). Einleitung zur Kenntniß der englischen Landwirthschaft und ihrer neueren practischen und theoretischen Fortschritte.
- Albrecht Daniel Thaer (1804). Beschreibung der nutzbarsten neuen Ackergeräthe. Volume 2.
- Albrecht Daniel Thaer (1806). Vermischte landwirtschaftliche Schriften. Volume 3
- Albrecht Daniel Thaer (1833). Grundsätze der rationellen landwirthschaft. 4 Volumes, (Volumes 3-4)
- Albrecht Daniel Thaer (1810). Annalen des Ackerbaues. Volume 12
- Albrecht Daniel Thaer (1811). Annalen der Fortschritte der Landwirthschaft in Theorie und Praxis. Volume 2
- Albrecht Daniel Thaer (1811). Handbuch für die feinwollige schaafzucht.
- Albrecht Daniel Thaer (1815). Leitfaden zur allgemeinen landwirtschaftlichen gewerbslehre.
- Albrecht Daniel Thaer (1826). Möglinsche Annalen der Landwirthschaft. Volume 17

Translations:

- Albert D. Thaër. Tr. by William Shaw and Cuthbert W. Johnson. The principles of agriculture. London, Ridgway, 1844.
- Albrecht Daniel Thaer, Augustus Olcott Moore. The Principles of Practical Agriculture Embracing ... A.O. Moore, Agricultural Book Publisher. 1858

=== About Albrecht Thaer ===
- Wilhelm Körte (1839) Albrecht Thaer: Sein Leben und Wirken.

== See also ==
- Statue of Albrecht Thaer, Berlin
