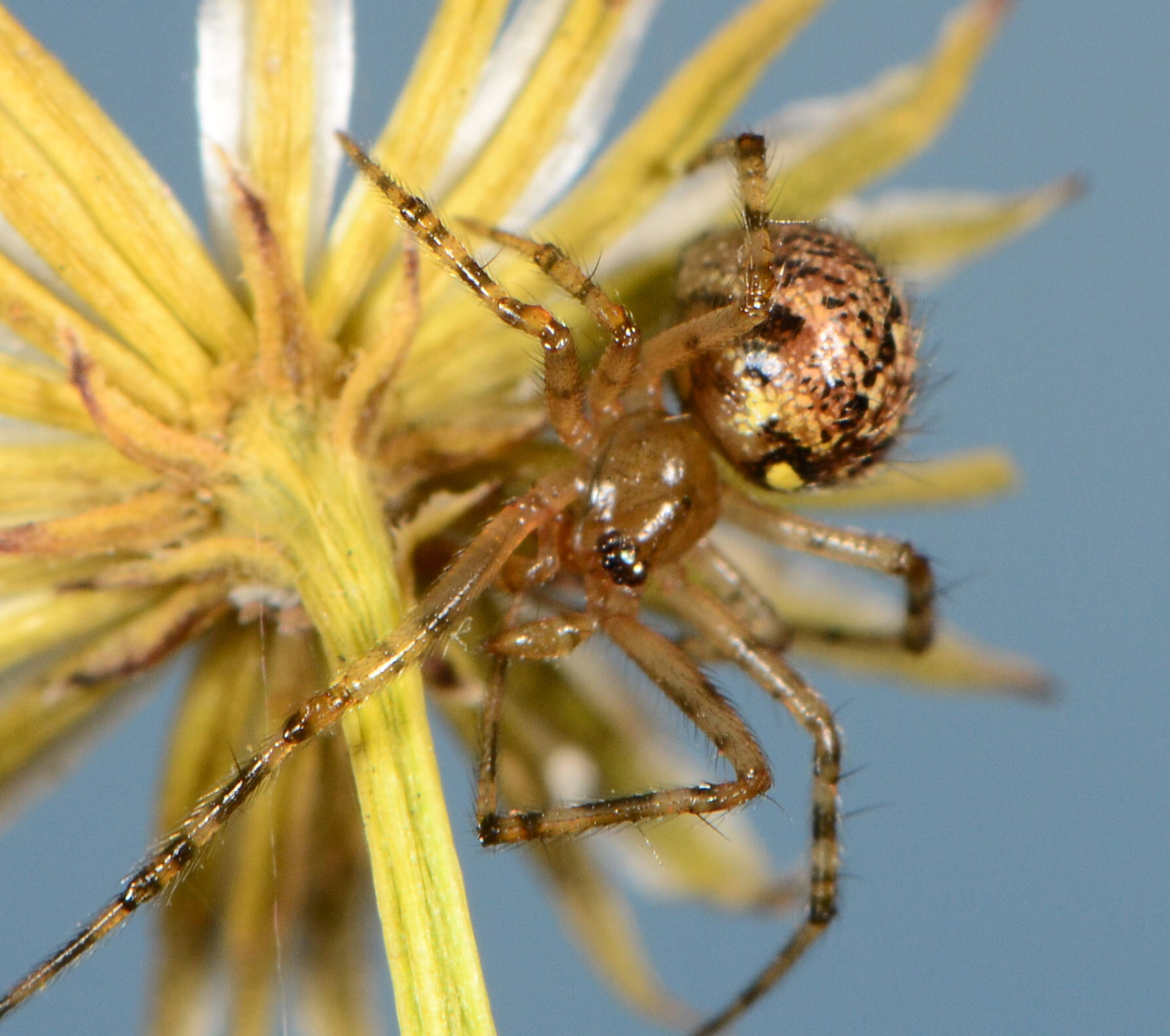
- Female

Scientific classification
- Kingdom: Animalia
- Phylum: Arthropoda
- Subphylum: Chelicerata
- Class: Arachnida
- Order: Araneae
- Infraorder: Araneomorphae
- Family: Theridiidae
- Genus: Theridion
- Species: T. pictum

Binomial name
- Theridion pictum (Walckenaer, 1802)

Synonyms
- Aranea picta Walckenaer, 1802; Theridion ornatum Hahn, 1831; Steatoda picta (Walckenaer, 1802); Theridion zelotypum Emerton, 1882; Allotheridion ornatum (Hahn 1831); Allotheridion zelotypum (Emerton, 1882); Allotheridion pictum (Walckenaer, 1802)

= Theridion pictum =

Species of spider

Theridion pictum is a species of cobweb spider in the family Theridiidae. It is found in the United States, Canada, Europe, and Turkey. It is the type species of the genus Theridion.

This species creates webs on a variety of vegetation such as bushes and tall grasses and flowers as well as on man made objects such as posts and fences. It is found in low, lying damp areas and has been recorded among moss and plant litter in wetlands. The males and females become mature in the early to mid-summer and the females may persist into November.

== Distribution ==
Theridion pictum has a Holarctic distribution across North America, Europe, North Africa, the Caucasus, Russia (Europe to Far East), Kazakhstan, Turkmenistan, China, and Japan. It has been introduced to South Africa. In South Africa it is known from Mpumalanga, KwaZulu-Natal, and Limpopo.

== Habitat and ecology ==
This species constructs three-dimensional webs in dark places usually close to the substrate and is frequently found under stones. It has been sampled with pitfall traps from the Savanna biome at altitudes ranging from 219 to 1341 m. The species has also been sampled from avocado and macadamia orchards.

== Description ==
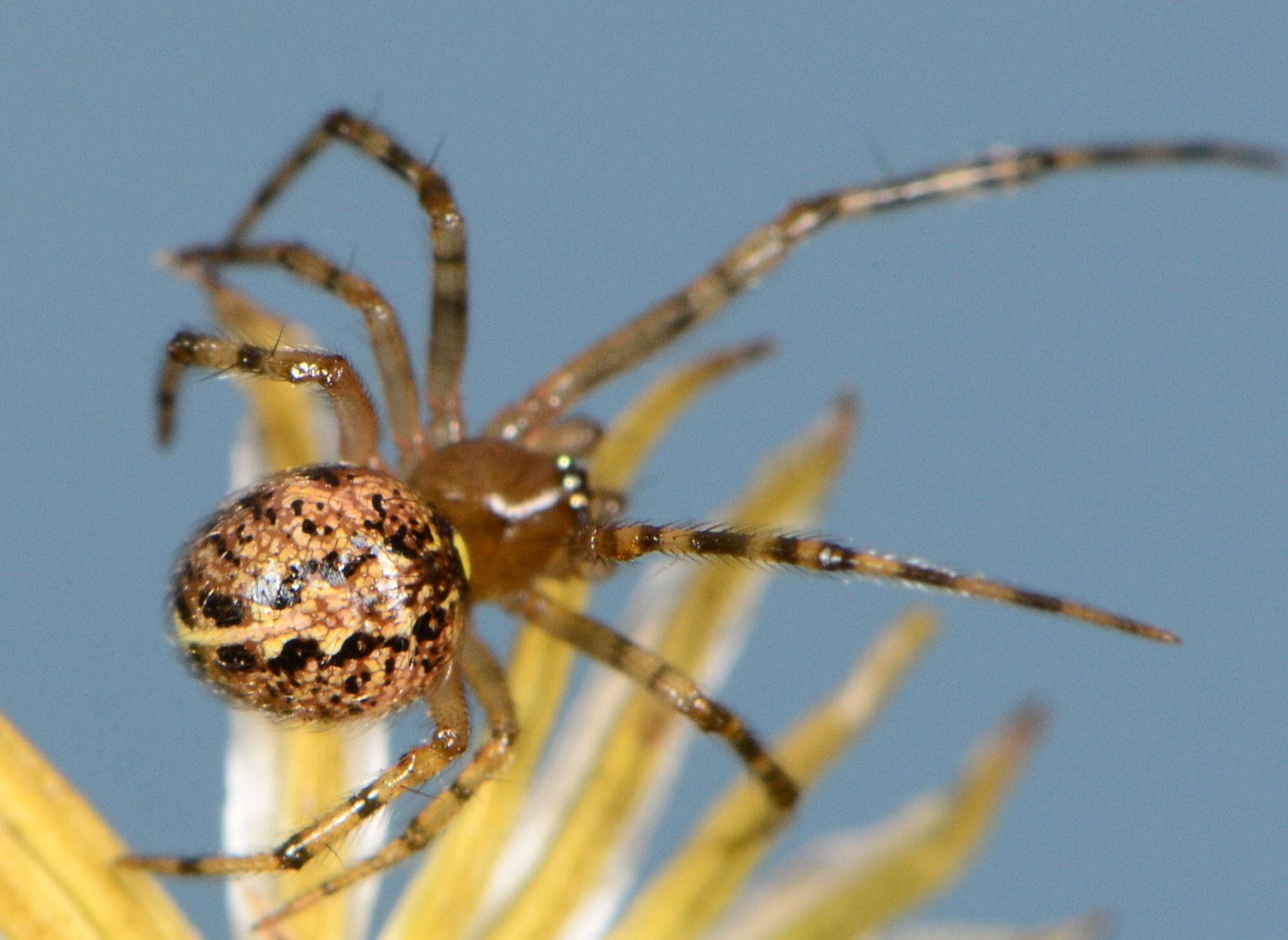

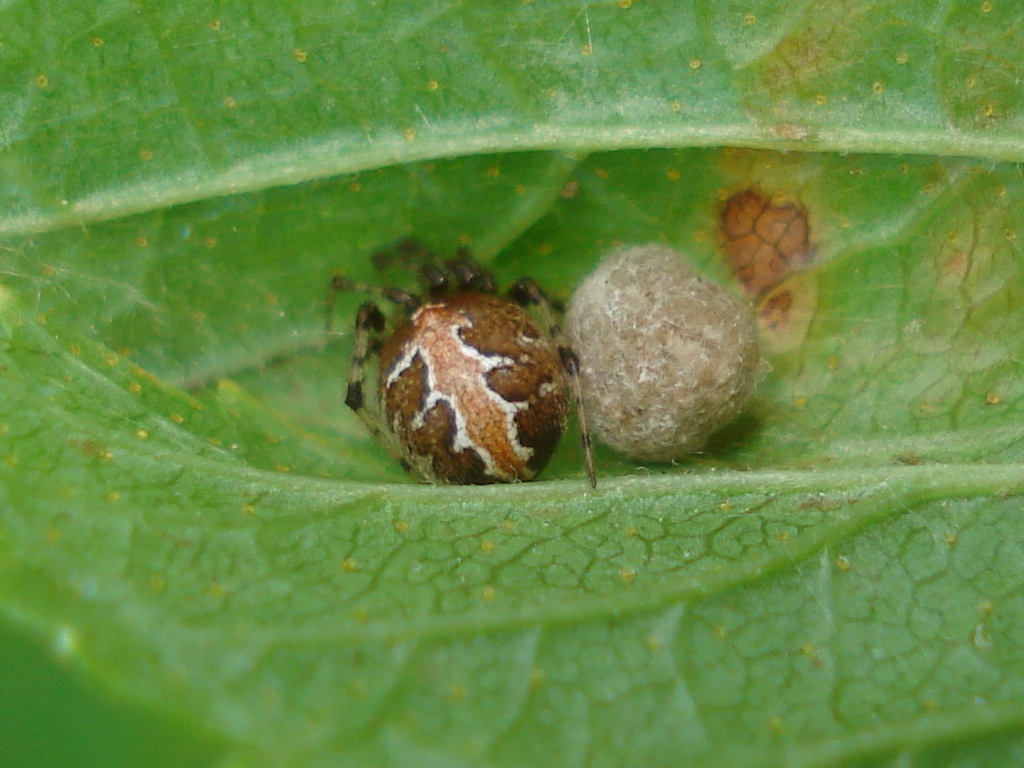

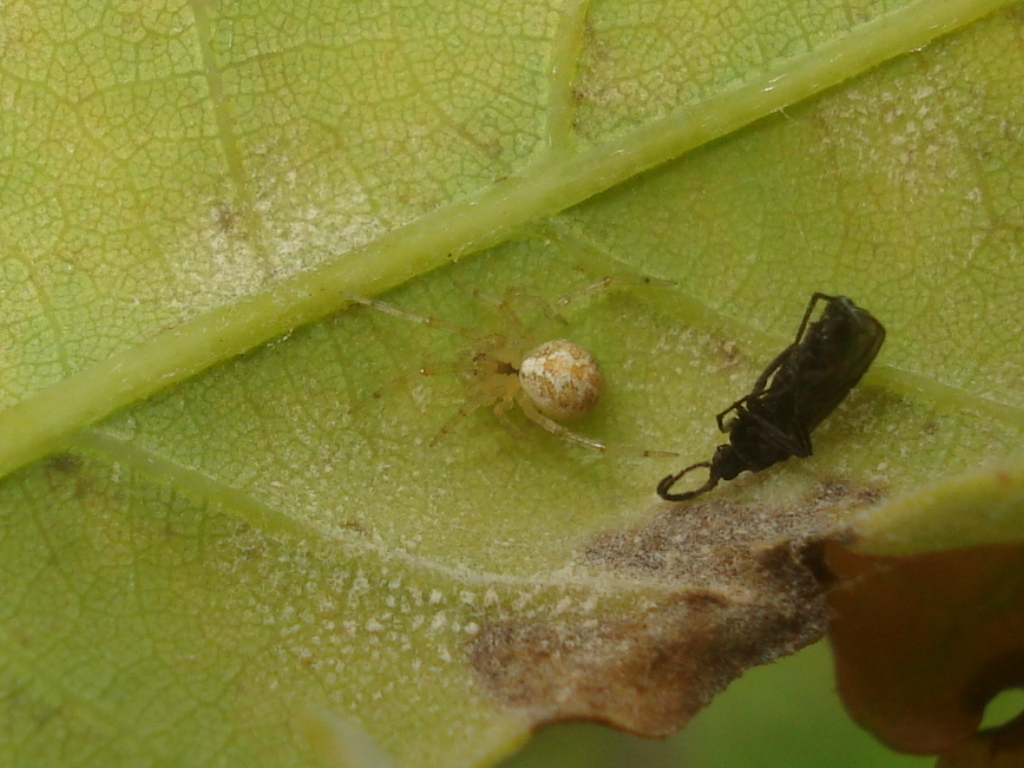

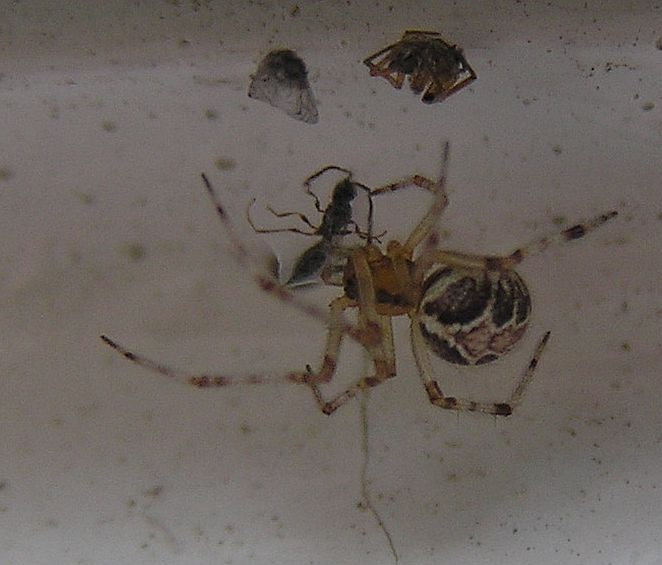

== Conservation ==
Theridion pictum is listed as Least Concern by the South African National Biodiversity Institute due to its wide global range.

== Taxonomy ==
Theridion pictum was originally described by Charles Athanase Walckenaer in 1802 as Aranea picta. The specific name picta was validated by the International Commission on Zoological Nomenclature in 1958 (Opinion 517). The species has not been revised in South Africa and is known from both sexes.
