= Johann Friedrich Mayer (agriculturist) =

German pastor and agricultural reformer

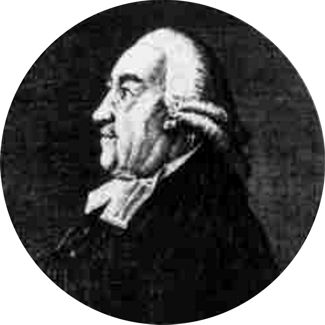
Johann Friedrich Mayer (1719–1798)

Johann Friedrich Georg Hartmann Mayer (September 21, 1719 – March 17, 1798) was a German Reformed pastor and agricultural reformer, who is considered one of the most important writers on agriculture of his time. He came to prominence through his efforts to promote agricultural reforms, especially with his 1769 publication with new regimes of crop rotation, and his 1773 textbook on rural householders and husbandry.

== Biography ==
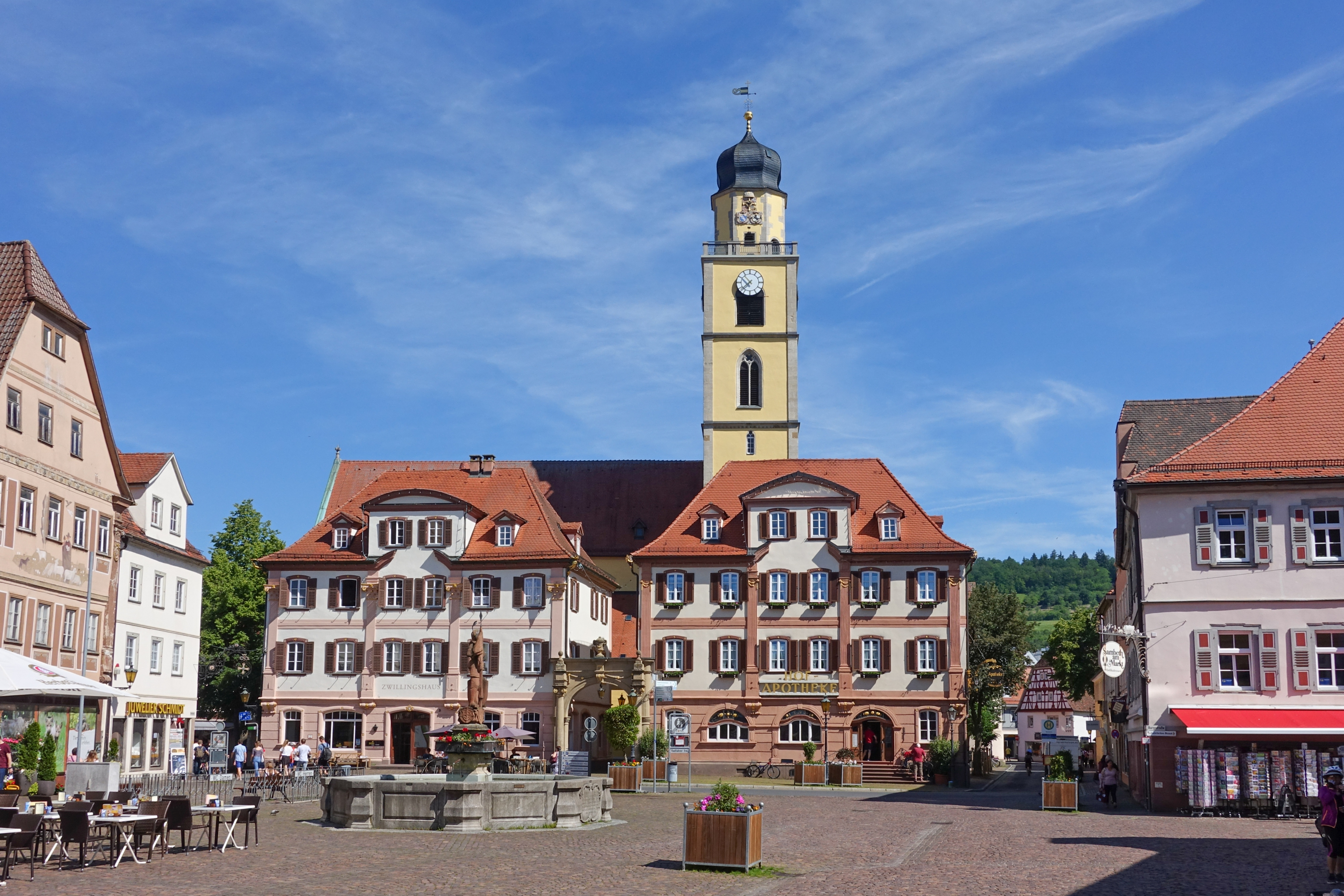
Bad Mergentheim Marktplatz.

Mayer was born in Bad Mergentheim as son of an innkeeper and Schultheiß, the head of a municipality. His parents prepared him to become a minister at early age. He attended the Latin School in Weikersheim and the high school in Öhringen. From 1737 to 1740 he took his theological studies at the University of Jena, where he was influenced by the philosopher Christian Wolff and the Swiss anatomist, physiologist and naturalist Albrecht von Haller.

From 1741 to 1745 Mayer was Protestant pastor in Riedbach, which ended up in a legal dispute about defamation. In 1745 he moved to Kupferzell, near Crailsheim, where he was pastor until his death in 1798. There in the garden of his clergy house, Mayer conducted agricultural experiments and observed farm work on nearby farms. In 1768 he published his findings for the first time in his book, entitled Lehre vom Gyps als vorzueglich guten Dung zu allen Erd-Gewaechsen auf Aeckern und Wiesen, Hopfen- und Weinbergen (Doctrine of Gypsum exquisitely as good manure to all natural plants to the fields and meadows, hops and vineyards). In this work he promoted the use of crushed gypsum as fertilization of fields, which he had found in the nearby Waldenburg Hills. He further explained these operations in the 1774 publication M. Terentius Varro, von der Landwirtschaft. The agronomists of his time where so impressed by his work, that they granted him the title "Gipsapostel von Kupferzell" (Apostle of gypsum from Kupferzell).

In other writings, Mayer started describing the farmer relationships in natural farming and animal husbandry. In 1767 he started publishing the journal Beyträge und Abhandlungen zur Aufnahme der Land- und Hauswirthschaft, which he would publish until 1786. In addition to spreading his knowledge through books and magazines, Mayer traveled around and advised princes and peasants. He was invited to move to Vienna, both by Emperor Maria Theresia and Archbishop Christoph Anton Migazzi, but he declined. He advised the Hohenlohe peasants among other things about the cultivation of the still unknown potato. At first he only recommended the potato to feed livestock, and later mainly for human consumption.

== Work ==
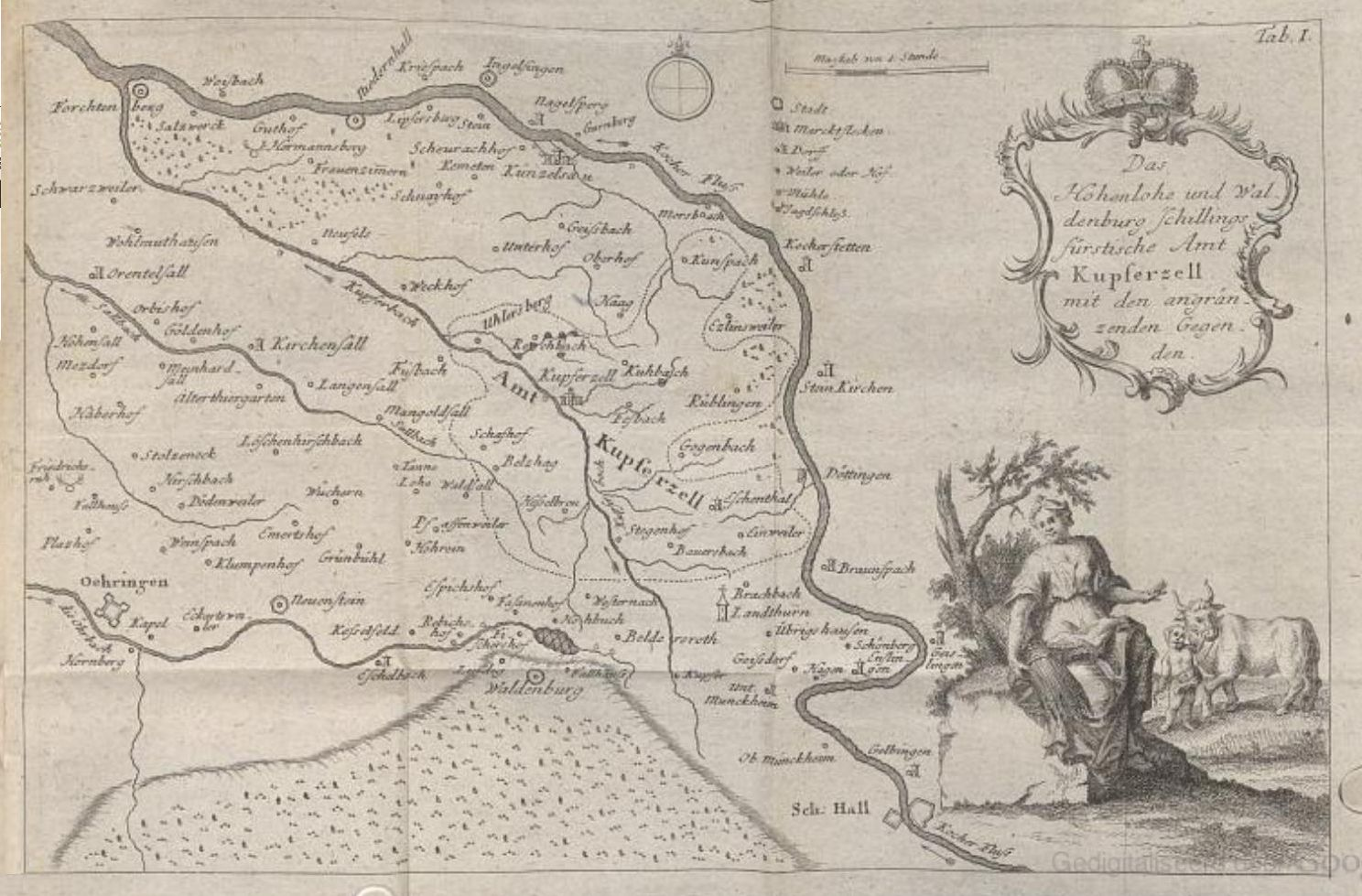
Map of the Hohenlohe, Lehrbuch für die Land- und Haußwirthe, Plate I, 1773

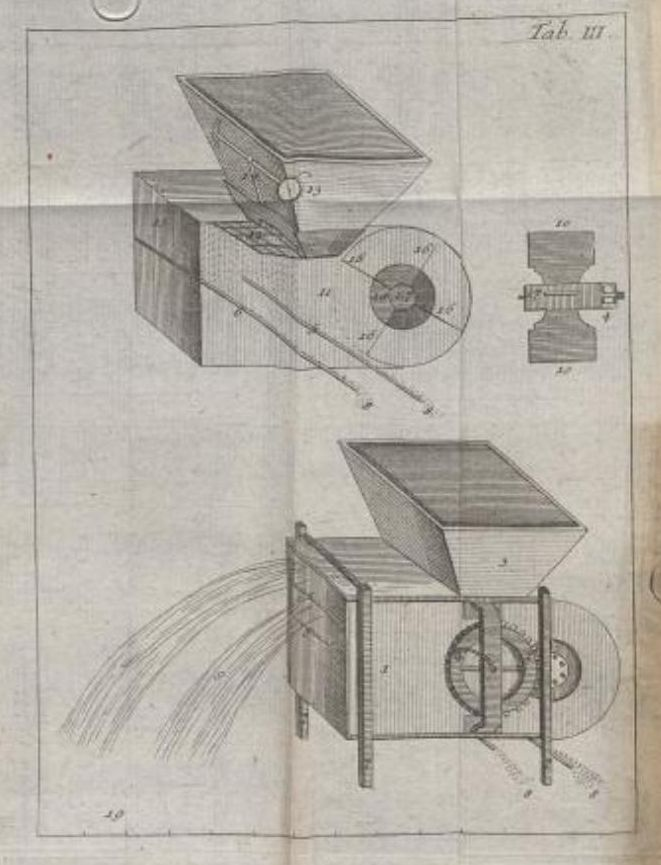
Plate III, 1773–82.

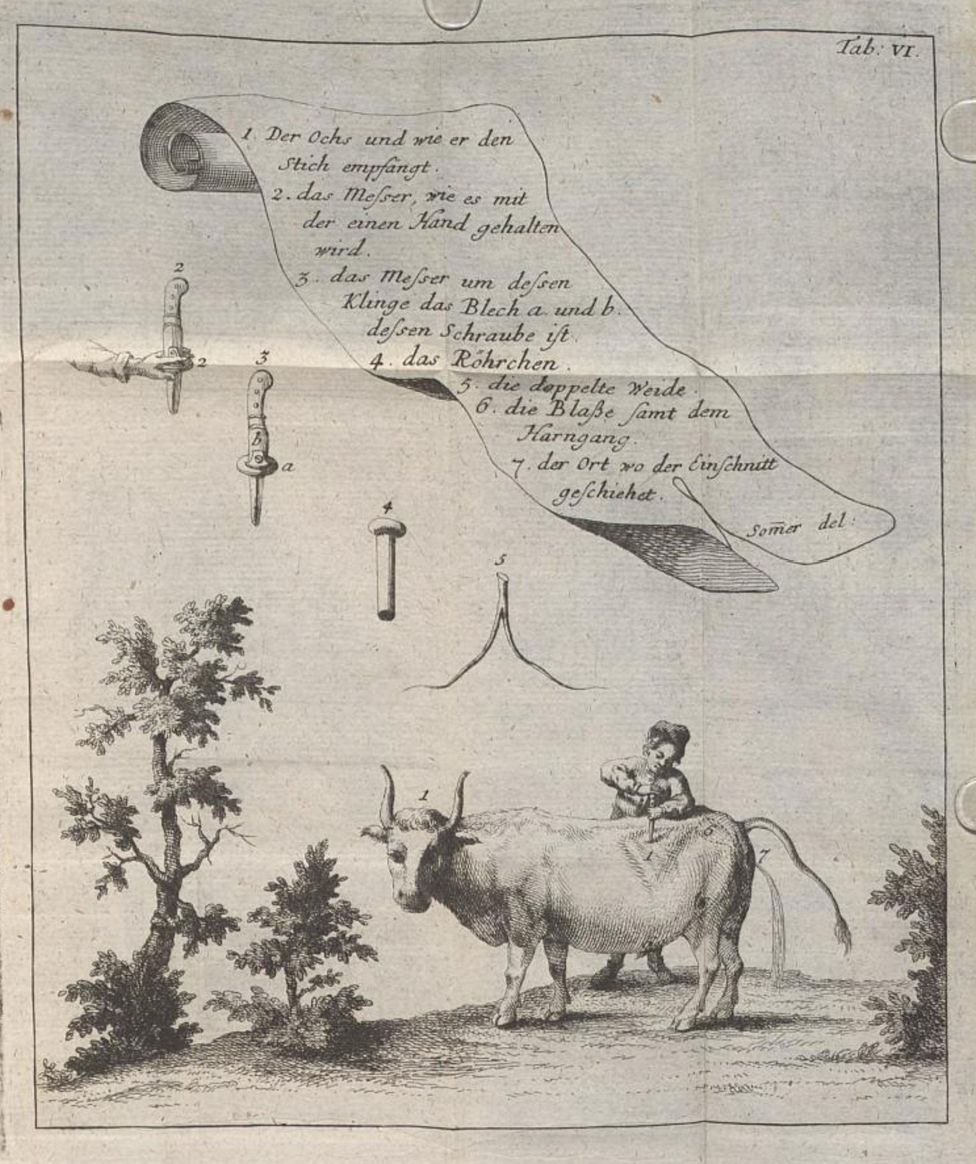
Plate VI, 1773–82.

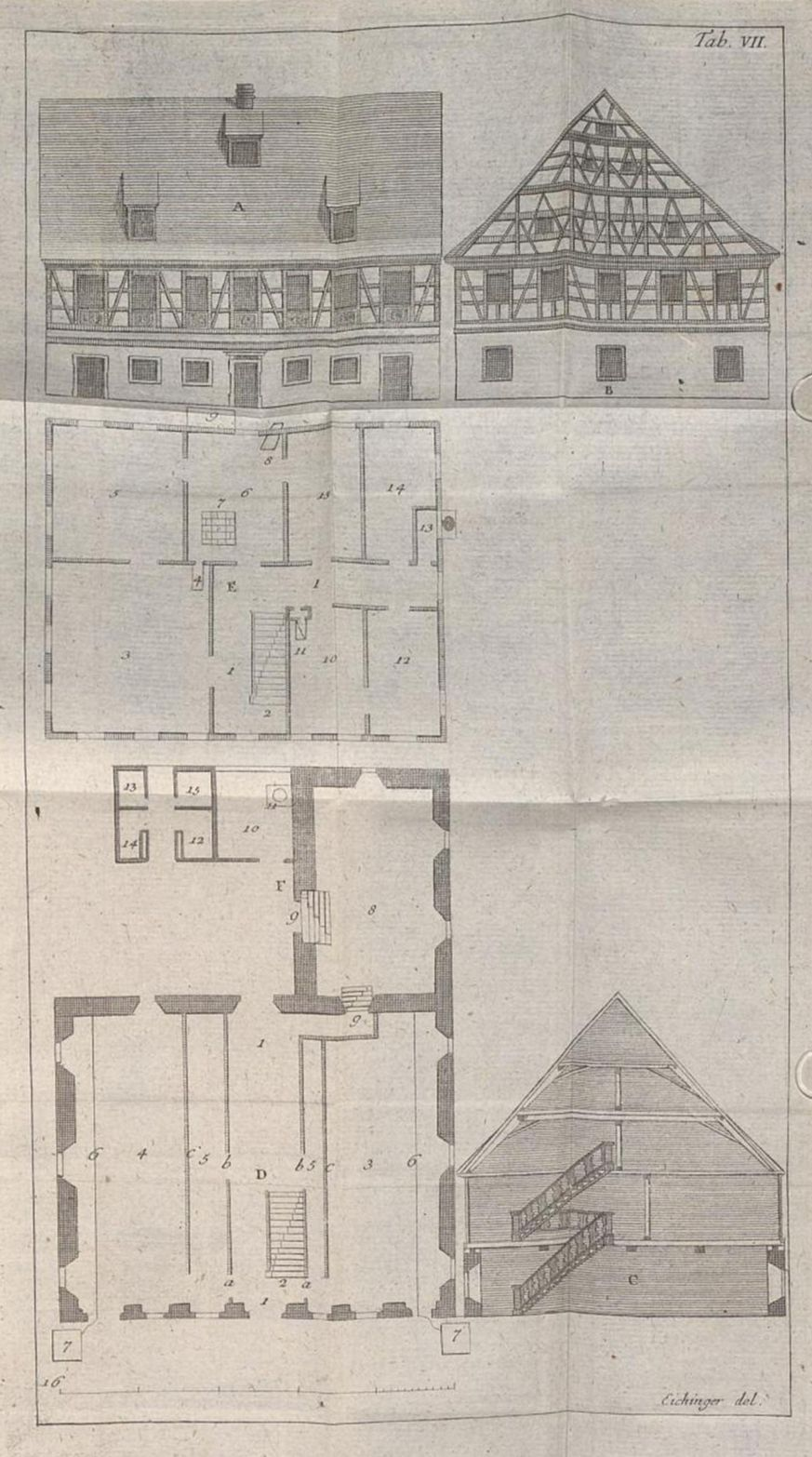
Design for farmhouse, Plate VII, 1773.

Mayer is considered the most influential agricultural reformers of the late 18th Century through his many writings, in which he promoted sustainable agricultural reforms such as the use of fertilizer, new crops, such as potatoes, new ways of crop rotation, sophisticated agricultural devices, and advanced management methods. He also advocated free property for peasants. In the 18th Century the pressure upon agriculture had increased to feed the steady growing population, and Mayer was one of the driving forces to make this happen.

=== Works ===
Mayer gained attention with his 1768 work Lehre vom Gyps als vorzueglich guten Dung zu allen Erd-Gewaechsen auf Aeckern und Wiesen, Hopfen- und Weinbergen, which promoted the use of crushed gypsum as fertilization of fields. This work also suggested new ways of crop rotation, which broke with the traditional medieval three-field system from around the time of Charlemagne.

The 1773 textbook on husbandry, entitled Lehrbuch für die Land- und Haußwirthe in der pragmatischen Geschichte der gesamten Land- und Haußwirthschafft des Hohenlohe Schillingsfürstischen Amtes Kupferzell, described the agriculture and other customs in the Hohenlohe region of the Germany. Mayer among others presented plans for a new farm house, the so-called "Pfarrer-Mayer-Häuser", in which the rural residential area and the barn were under one roof. The barn, located on the ground floor, would heat the living room on the first floor.

The introduction of fodder and the growing of cider apples in specific German regions date back to Mayer's ideas. For better use of land Mayer suggested the farmers to plant fallow land with clover. Thereby farmers gained additional fodder, which Mayer recommended to use in the stabling of cattle. A desirable side effect of stabling was the increased accumulation of manure that could be used as fertilizer on fields.

Also thanks to Mayer's proposals the cattle were sold in Hohenlohe and were profitable for the farmers. The slaughter was sold to France, especially Paris. The improved three-field system, which is still the basis for the agricultural processing, also goes back to Pastor Mayer.

=== Valuable fossil as a manure ===
The 1804 Repertory of arts, manufactures and agriculture Richard Weston reports that "New manure appearing as an uncommon phenomenon in the Annals of Agriculture, it cannot be an uninteresting matter to disperse the knowledge of its valuable qualities, and how it came to be known, especially as it is now making a rapid progress into every enlightened country where the farmers are not above being taught from the ingenuity, labour, and researches of others, and of all the modern improvements in agriculture no one appears to be of greater consequence..." The general description, Weston gave, started with:

Description of the best Sort, and Method of proving its Quality.

From the experiments made in America, it is found, that that which is produced near the surface of the ground has not the qualities necessary for vegetation in so powerful a manner as that which is dug deeper, on account of the sun, frosts, and atmosphere weakening its virtues, and that the lumps composed of flat shining specula are preferred to those which are formed of round particle* like sand; but that all kinds of gypsum, however different in exterior form or appearance, have a perfect resemblance in their chemical and essential qualities.
To try its quality, some should be pulverized very fine; then put dry into an iron pot placed on the fire, and if it be good it will soon boil, and great quantities of the fixed air will escape by ebullition.

Method of preparing it.

The usual method of preparing it is, by first stamping it in a stamping-mill, and then grinding it in a common grist-mill; but the finer it is ground it is so much the better, nor must it be calcined, and the fresher from the quarry the qualities will be the stronger.
If you have not a stamping-mill break it with a large hammer, and then sift or grind it.

The Marnier, Quantity, and Time of sowing it.

The method of putting it on the land is sowing it in the broad-cast manner, as you sow corn, and the only Care necessary is to make the distribution as equal as possible. A day inclining to rain is to be preferred for sowing it; but if the weather be very dry it ought to be moistened before it is sown, to prevent it from blowing away, and the distribution being unequal.
From a variety of experiments already made, from six to eight bushels to an acre seem to be the most approved quantity for grass or clover; but when only half of the quantity has been used, its effects have been very visible, and more productive by three tons to an acre than some of the same land left unplastered. One farmer mentions that he used nine bushels...

Weston further explains about experiments on various soils, its effects on grasslands, and a comparison between dung and plaster. He ends up describing the experiments with fossil as a manure has had on barley and clover, buckwheat, cabbages and turnips, clover alone, Indian corn, rye and wheat.

Weston explicitly mentioned, that "it is to the indefatigable researches of Mr. Mayer, a German clergyman, that we are indebted for this valuable fossil as a manure; but where his residence is I have not yet been able to discover, nor have seen any of his .writings concerning it. In the year 1768 he first discovered its virtues as a manure, and its reputation soon caused it to be tried in various parts of Germany. Thence its fame spread to Switzerland and France. Near to Paris are several hills of it, named Montmartre, whence the Americans transported it to their country, and its reputation soon spread it through that continent, even to Quebec. As a proof of which, I have taken an account of the following experiments, from a book printed in that city, in French and English, but first published in various periodical works in Philadelphia, Pennsylvania, &c.; and from these American publications it was introduced into England, after having made a circuit of nearly ten thousand miles."

== Legacy ==
Johann Friedrich Mayer was the first to present to the public a series of experiments upon it the relation of gypsum to agriculture, and many chemists have followed him in the 19th century. Early 19th century however a great variety of opinion remained with regard to its mode of operation, for example:

- The French agronomist Victor Yvart (1763–1831) believed that the action of gypsum is exclusively the effect of the sulphuric acid, which enters into its composition; and founds this opinion upon the fact that the ashes of turf, which contain sulphate of iron and sulphate of alumina, have the same action upon vegetation as gypsum.
- The French agronomist Charles Philibert de Lasteyrie (1759–1849), observing that plants whose roots were nearest the surface of the soil were most acted upon by plaster, concludes that gypsum takes from the atmosphere the elements of vegetable life, and transmits them directly to plants.
- Louis Augustin Guillaume Bosc intimates that the septic quality of gypsum (which he takes for granted) best explains its action on vegetation; but this opinion is subverted by the experiments of Davy.
- Humphry Davy found that, of two parcels of minced veal, the one mixed with gypsum, the other left by itself, and both exposed to the action of the sun, the latter was the first to exhibit symptoms of putrefaction. Davy's own belief on this subject is, that it makes part of the food of vegetables, is received into the plant, and combined with it. Davy postulated the idea of atmospheric carbon, which was dismissed by Albrecht Daniel Thaer, who postulated instead his "humus theory."

After being applied with success by Mayer in the year 1763, Gypsum soon came into general use, not only in Germany, but in France, America, Switzerland, and other countries. Sutton Thomas Wood of Oxford (1807) acknowledged, that it was cheaper than dung composts, much more convenient for carriage, and may be attained, where dung cannot be had. Its value cannot easily be ascertained, as there are few soils that will not be benefited by its application. It renews and invigorates those lands which have been exhausted by neglect and improper management, and it wonderfully improves some stubborn clays.

Another lasting contribution was Mayer's farmhouse design, presented in his 1773 textbook on agriculture and husbandry. This design; known as the so-called "Pfarrer-Mayer-Häuser", became quite popular not only in the area of Hohenlohe, but in larger parts of Germany. The type of farms are still present visible in rural Germany, and are nowadays characterized as the typical Hohenlohe's farmhouse.

Mayer is considered among the most important agricultural reformer of the late 18th century. To socially improve the situation of the rural population, Mayer advised his readers not just about to changing agricultural methods, but he was strongly committed and an outspoken advocate for change in the agrarian structure. He called for the abolition of forced labor and inveighs against hunting and pasture justices of the lord. The range of subjects treated by him is great from topics classified under the purely agricultural engineering to cultivation, fertilization, harvesting, livestock, etc. But he, again and again, focussed his writings on social ethical and diaconal questions of his town, and openly criticized that rural life would be better served with dutiful authorities and philanthropic landowner.

== Selected publications ==
- Johann F. Mayer. Lehre vom Gyps als vorzueglich guten Dung zu allen Erd-Gewaechsen auf Aeckern und Wiesen, Hopfen- und Weinbergen. Anspach 1768; 2. Aufl. 1769.
- Johann F. Mayer. Lehrbuch für die Land- und Haußwirthe in der pragmatischen Geschichte der gesamten Land- und Haußwirthschafft des Hohenlohe Schillingsfürstischen Amtes Kupferzell. Nürnberg 1773.
- Johann F. Mayer. M. Terentius Varro, von der Landwirtschaft. 1774
- Johann Friedrich Mayer. Mein ökonomischer Briefwechsel, Vol. 1. Andreae, 1778.
- Johann Friederich Mayers. Katechismus des Feldbaues für den baierischen Landmann umgearbeitet. Johan Bapt Strobl. 1785.
- Johann F. Mayer. Kupferzell durch die Landwirthschaft im besten Wohlstand. Leipzig 1793.
- Johann F. Mayer, Albrecht Daniel Thaer. Über die Anlage der Schwemm-Wiesen. 1800
- Johann Friedrich Mayer, Jakob Ernst von Reider, Johann Jakob Weidenkeller. Das Ganze der Landwirthschaft, Volume 2. Newly edited and improved. C. H. Zehschen Buchhandlung, 1823.

=== About Johann Friedrich Mayer ===
- Georg Wilhelm Heinrich Mayer: Johann Friedrich Mayer der Apostel des Gipses. Ein Charakter- und Kulturbild aus dem 18. Jahrhundert. Edenkoben 1899 (with image).
- Karl Schumm: Pfarrer Johann Friedrich Mayer und die hohenlohesche Landwirtschaft im 18. Jahrhundert. In: Württembergisch Franken 1955, Neue Folge 30 = Jahrbuch des Historischen Vereins für Württembergisch Franken 1955, pp. 138–167 (with image and list of publications).
- Karl Schumm: Johann Friedrich Georg Hartmann Mayer. Pfarrer, Förderer der Landwirtschaft 1719–1798. In: Schwäbische Lebensbilder Vol. 6, 1957, pp. 139–152 (with image and list of publications).
- Klaus Herrmann (1990). "Mayer, Johann Friedrich". Neue Deutsche Biographie (in German). Vol. 16. Berlin: Duncker & Humblot. pp. 544–545. (full text online).
- Rolf Becker: "Leute, die so unglücklich sind, nicht einmal die Rechte der wilden Thiere unter ihren Mitmenschen zu geniessen" – Volksaufklärung und eine "Theologie der Befreiung" im achtzehnten Jahrhundert. In: Friedhelm Krüger (Hg.), Gottes Offenbarung in der Welt, Gütersloh 1998, pp. 73–88
- Hans Dieter Haller: Johann Friedrich Mayer (1719 bis 1798). In: Pegasus auf dem Land – Schriftsteller in Hohenlohe. Baier-Verlag 2006, pp. 220–227.
