= Statue of Albrecht Thaer, Berlin =

Statue in Berlin, Germany

Statue of Albrecht Thaer
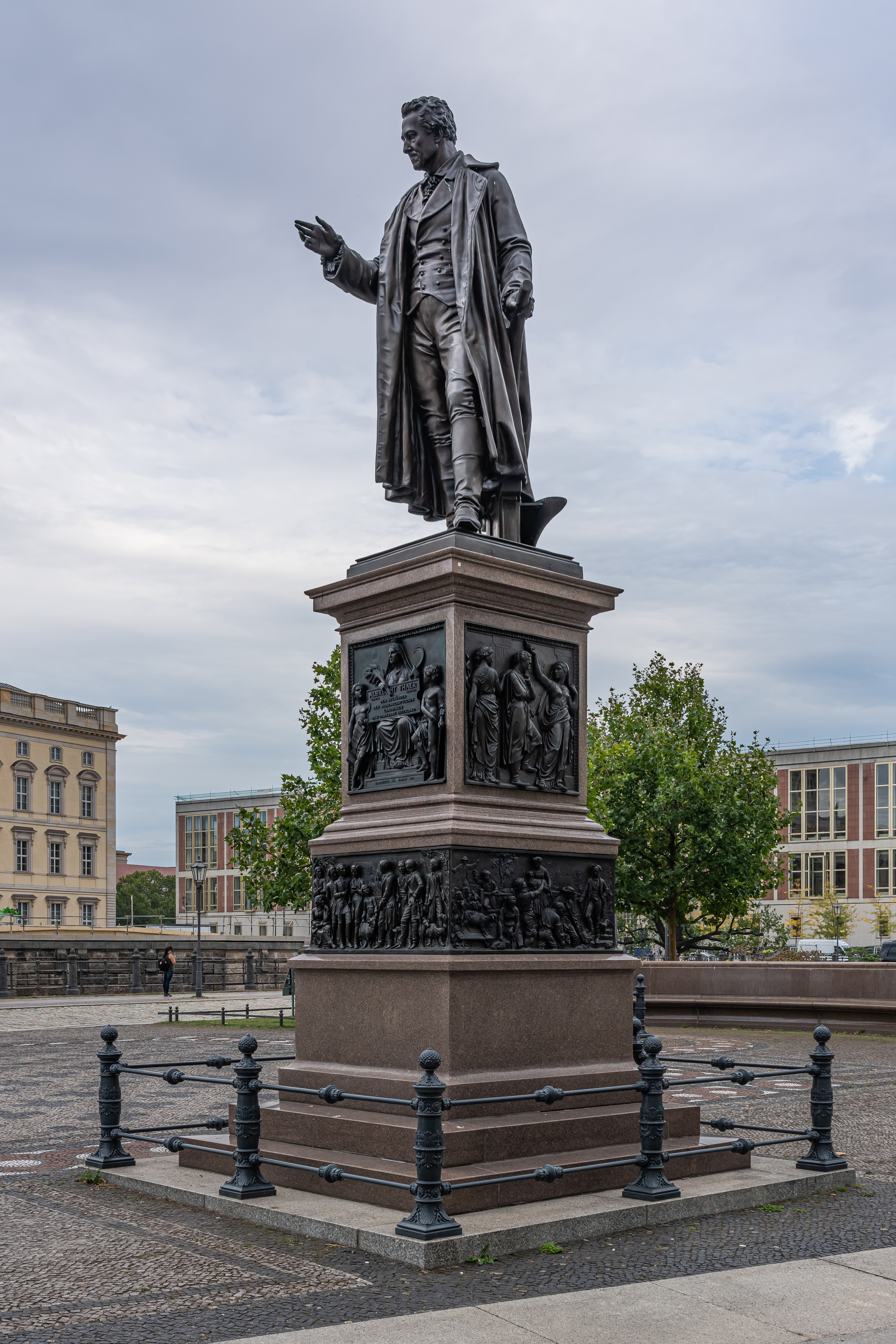
- The sculpture in 2023
- Medium: Bronze sculpture
- Subject: Albrecht Thaer
- Location: Berlin, Germany

The statue of Albrecht Thaer is a bronze sculpture installed at Schinkelplatz in Berlin, Germany.
