= Statue of Karl Friedrich Schinkel, Berlin =

Statue in Berlin, Germany

Statue of Karl Friedrich Schinkel
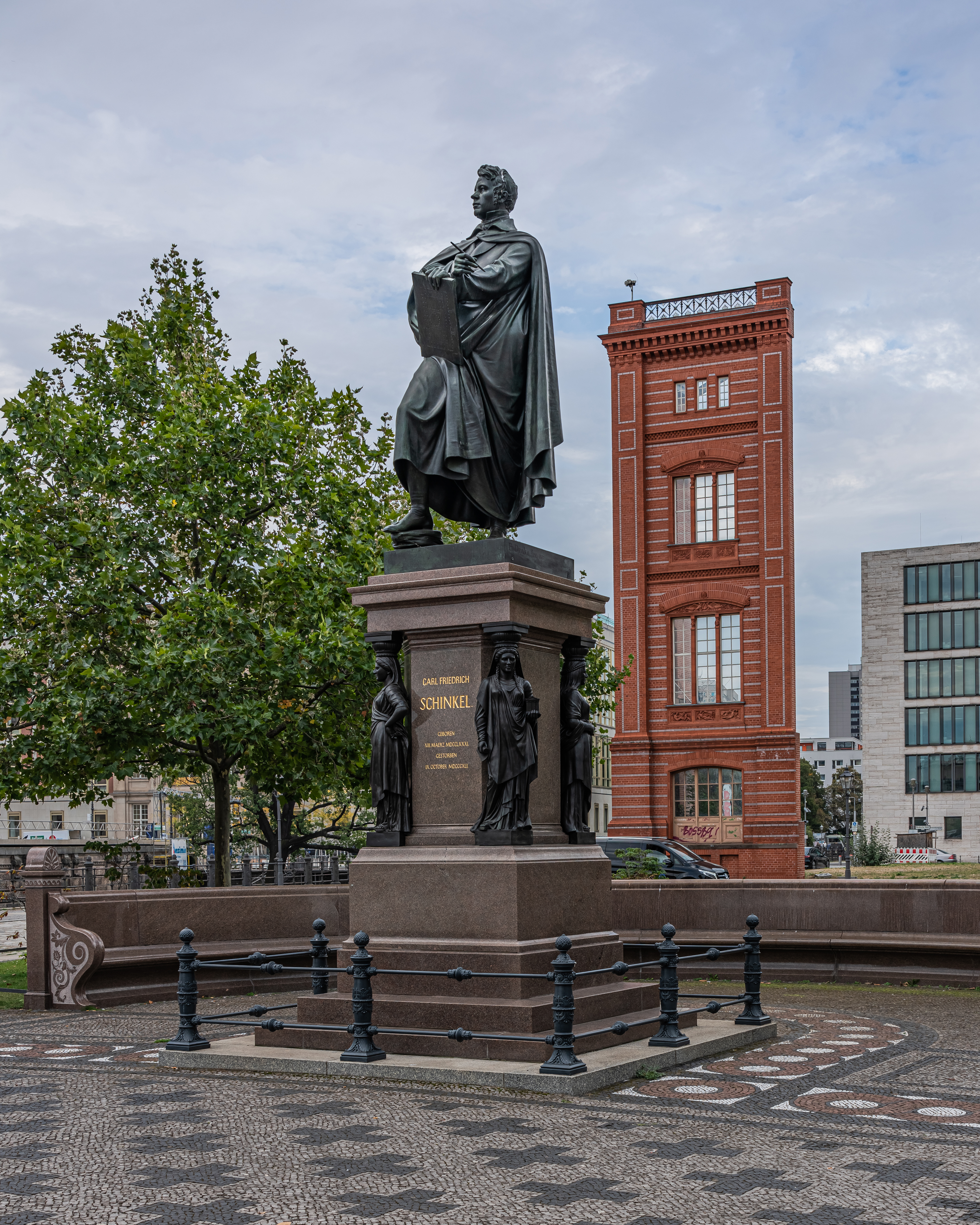
- The statue in 2023
- Medium: Bronze sculpture
- Subject: Karl Friedrich Schinkel
- Location: Berlin, Germany

The statue of Karl Friedrich Schinkel is a bronze sculpture installed at Schinkelplatz in Berlin, Germany.
