= Johann Friedrich Ludwig Hausmann =

German mineralogist (1782-1859)

Johann Friedrich Ludwig Hausmann LVA
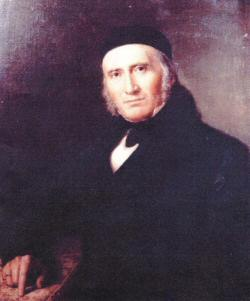
- Born: February 22, 1782; Hanover, Electorate of Hanover, Kingdom of Great Britain
- Died: Göttingen, Kingdom of Hanover, German Confederation
- Education: Collegium Carolinum
- Alma mater: University of Göttingen
- Occupation: Mineralogist

Johann Friedrich Ludwig Hausmann (22 February 1782 – 26 December 1859) was a German mineralogist.

== Biography ==
He was born in Hannover and educated in Göttingen, where he obtained a PhD. Two years after making a geological tour of Denmark–Norway and Sweden in 1807, he was placed at the head of a government mining establishment in Westphalia, and established a school of mines at Clausthal in the Harz mountains.

In 1811 he was appointed professor of technology and mining, and later of geology and mineralogy at the University of Göttingen, which he occupied until shortly before his death. Additionally, he was secretary of the Royal Academy of Sciences in Göttingen for many years. In 1813, he was elected a foreign member of the Royal Swedish Academy of Sciences.

He published observations on the geology and mineralogy of Spain and Italy as well as that of central and northern Europe: he wrote on gypsum, pyrites, felspar, tachylite, cordierite and some eruptive rocks, and devoted much attention to the crystals developed during metallurgical processes

In 1816, with Friedrich Stromeyer, he described the mineral allophane. In 1847 he coined the mineral name biotite in honor of physicist Jean Baptiste Biot. He is also credited with coining the names pyromorphite (1813) and rhodochrosite (1813).

== Selected publications ==
- Reise durch Skandinavien in den jahren 1806 und 1807, (1811) – Journey to Scandinavia in 1806 and 1807.
- Untersuchungen über die Formen der leblosen Natur, 1821 – Studies on the forms of inanimate nature.
- Johann Friedrich Ludwig Hausmann, Franz Körte. Versuch einer geologischen Begründung des Acker- und Forstwesens, 1825.
- Handbuch der Mineralogie, 1828–1847 (second edition, 3 volumes) – Handbook of mineralogy.
- Über den gegenwärtigen zustand und die wichtigkeit des hannoverschen Harzes, 1832 – On the current state and the importance of Hannoverian Harz.
