= Peter Beuth =

Prussian statesman

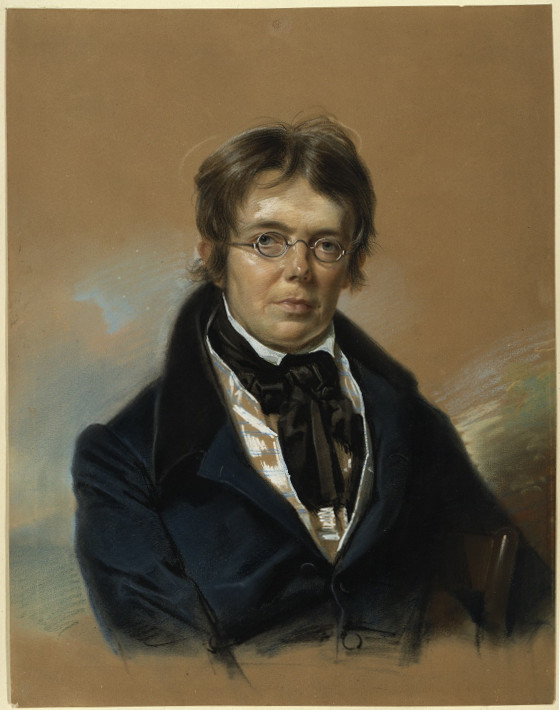
Christian Peter Wilhelm Beuth c. 1835

Christian Peter Wilhelm Friedrich Beuth (28 December 1781 – 27 September 1853) was a Prussian statesman, involved in the Prussian reforms and the main mover in Prussia's industrial renewal.

== Life and career ==
Beuth was born in Cleves; his father was an artist. He entered the University of Halle in 1798 to study law and cameralism. In 1799 he became a member of the Corps Guestphalia Halle.

He entered the Prussian civil service in 1801, becoming Assessor in Bayreuth in 1806, followed in 1809 by a position in Potsdam and in 1810 at the head of the taxation section of the finance ministry in Berlin. In 1813/14 he was a member of the Lützow Free Corps and fought in the liberation campaign against Napoleon; he was awarded the Iron Cross 2nd class.

Beuth was a member of the Deutsche Tischgesellschaft, founded in Berlin in 1811 by Achim von Arnim and Adam Heinrich Müller. This was an antisemitic organisation, and he expressed disapproval of equality under the law for Jews.

In his position in the finance ministry, Beuth was a member of the commission for the reform of taxation and manufacturing in the office of the Chancellor Karl August von Hardenberg; after the end of the Napoleonic Wars he participated in drafting the new tax laws of 1817. In 1821 he was promoted to Staatsrat, and in 1830 he became director of the Department of Manufacturing, Trade and Construction, a position he held until 1845. He left the ministry in autumn 1845 with the rank of Wirklicher Geheimer Rat (full privy councillor), but remained a member of the council of state.

He died in Berlin in 1853 and is buried in the Dorotheenstadt cemetery near his friend Karl Friedrich Schinkel. His grave is recognised as an honorary grave of the City of Berlin and was designed by Reinhold Begas.

== See also ==
- Statue of Peter Beuth
