= Schinkelplatz =

Square in Berlin, Germany

Coordinates: 52.5166°N 13.3982°E

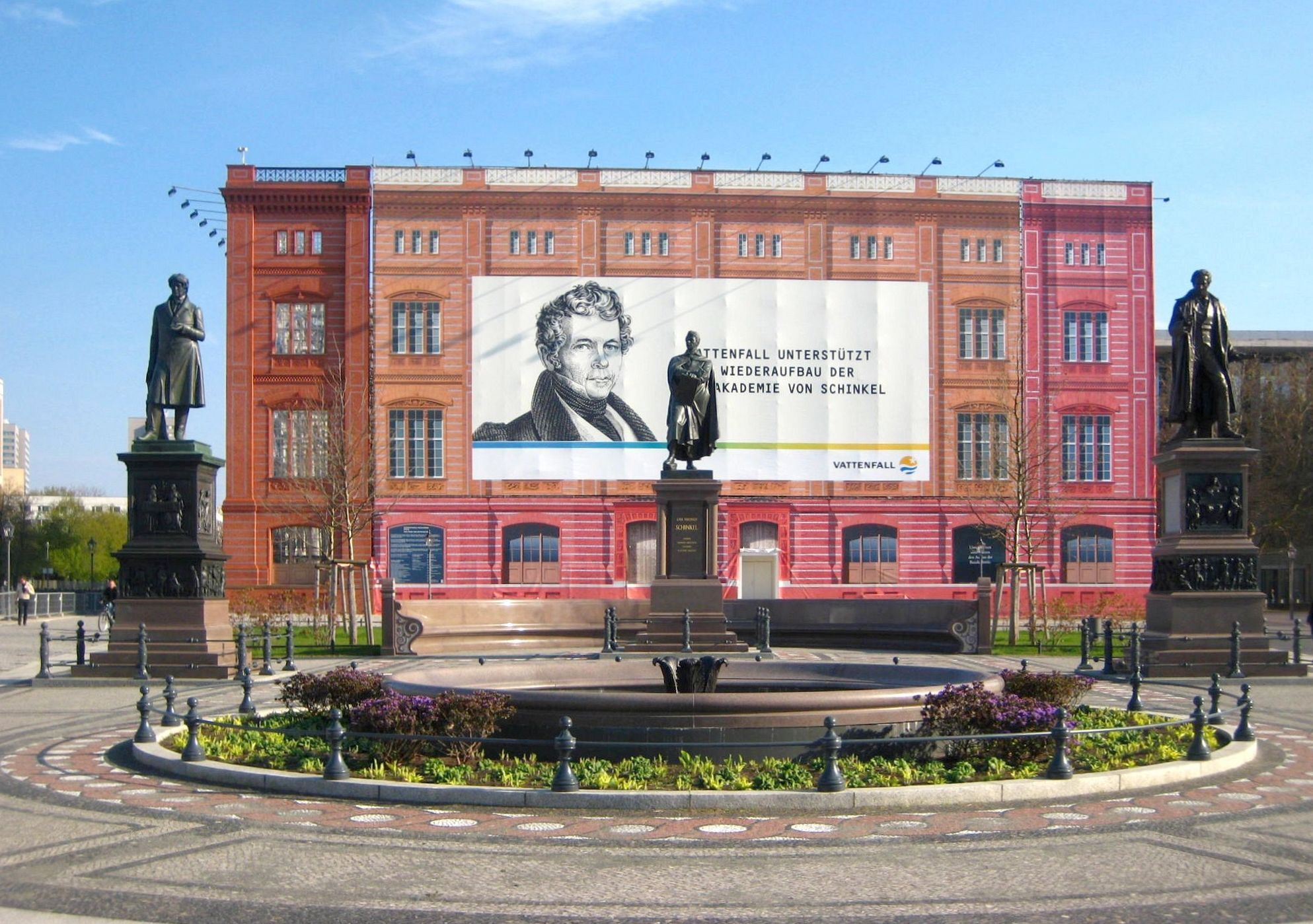
Schinkelplatz, 2010

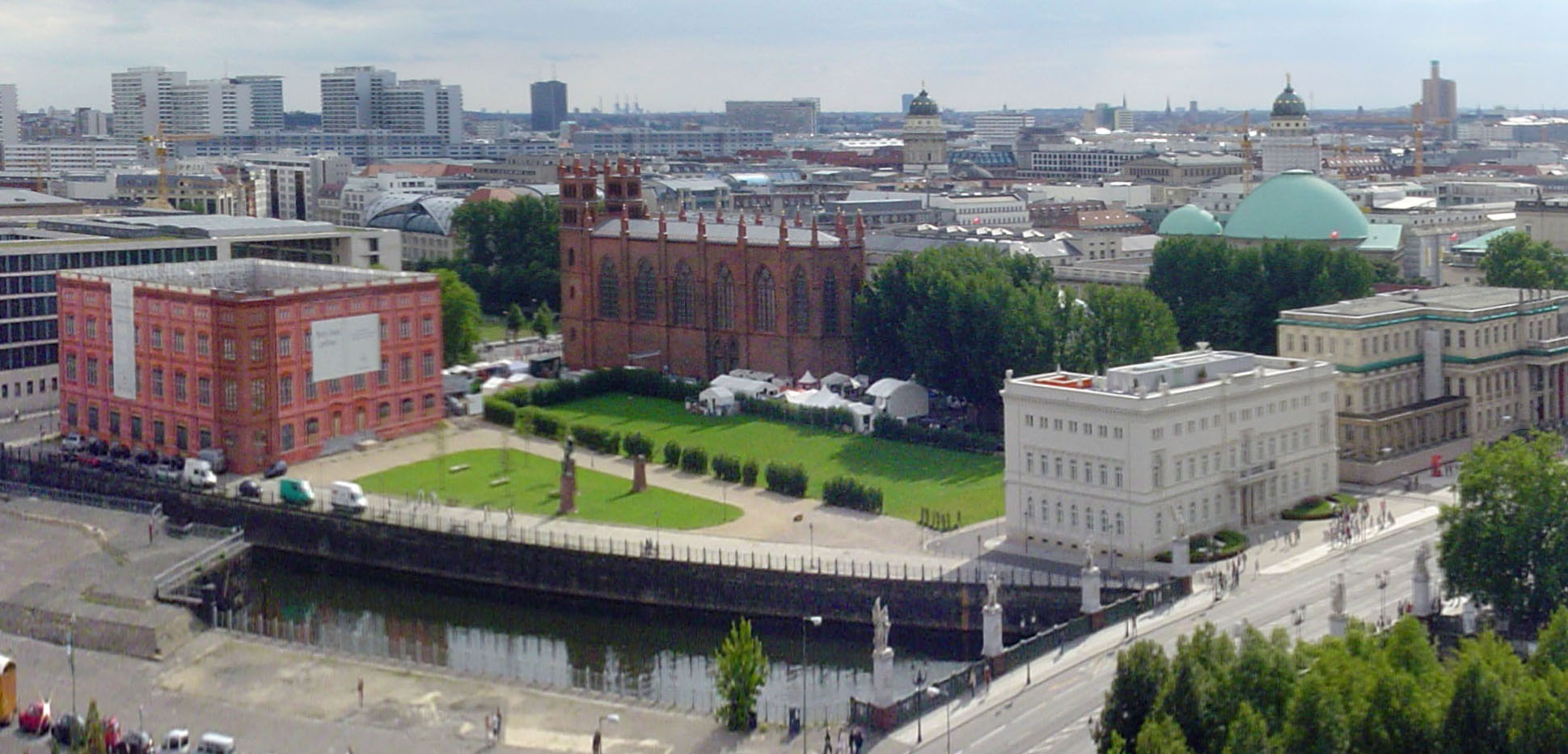
The square in 2008

Schinkelplatz is a square in Berlin, Germany, named after Karl Friedrich Schinkel.

On one side of the square stands the Bauakademie, under wraps waiting to be rebuilt, and on the other, the neo-Gothic Friedrichswerder Church. In front of both buildings, there is a statue of Schinkel. More recent buildings include a block of apartments, offices, shops and restaurants designed by Axel Schultes and Charlotte Frank; Rafael Moneo; and the firm Hemprich Tophof.

The square also has statues of Albrecht Thaer and Christian Peter Wilhelm Beuth.

== See also ==
- Darmstädter Bank
- Ministry for Foreign Affairs (East Germany)
