= Statue of Peter Beuth =

Statue in Berlin, Germany

Statue of Christian Peter Wilhelm Beuth
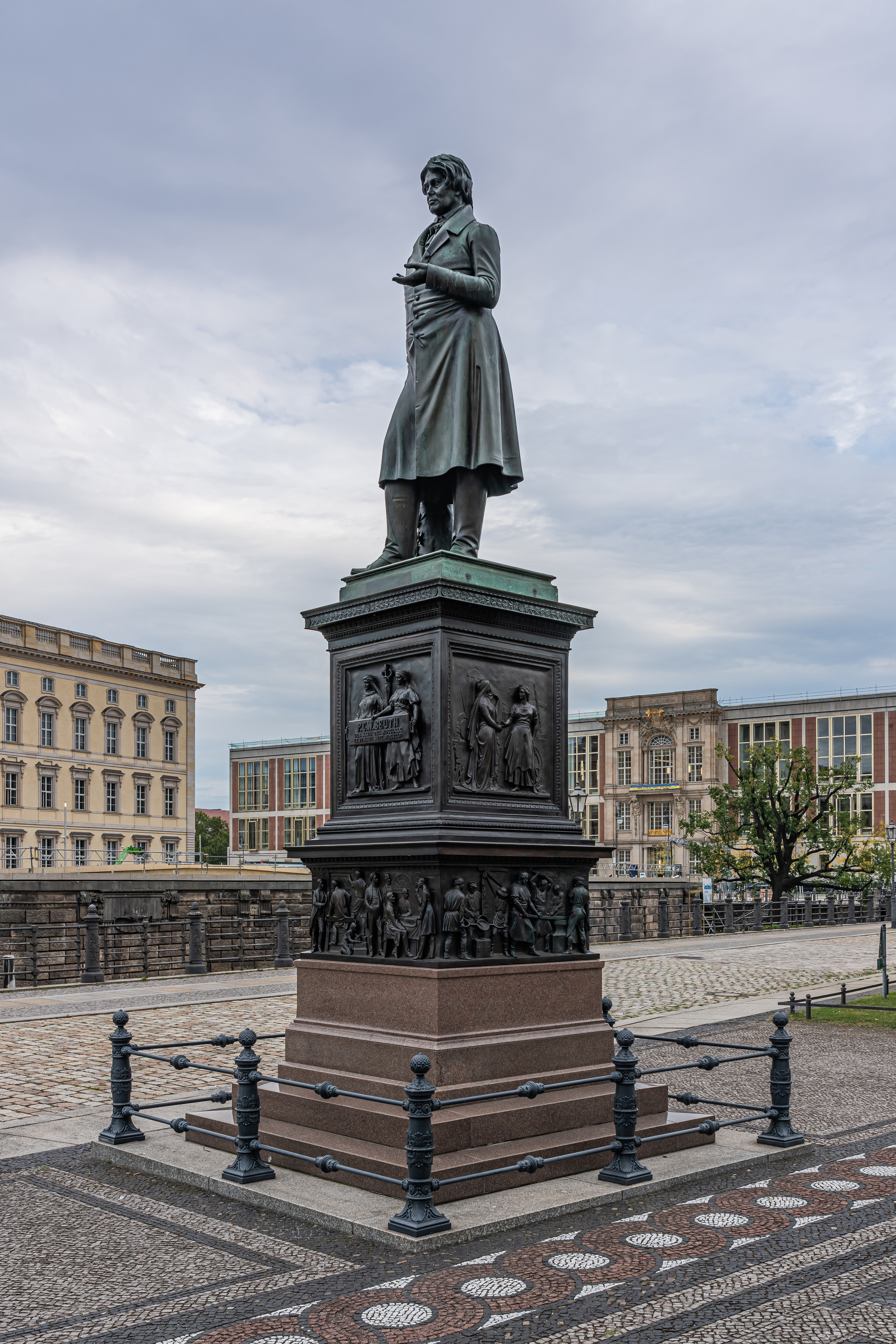
- The statue in 2023
- Artist: August Kiss
- Medium: Bronze sculpture
- Subject: Christian Peter Wilhelm Beuth
- Location: Berlin, Germany

A bronze statue of Christian Peter Wilhelm Beuth by August Kiss is installed at Schinkelplatz in Berlin, Germany.
