= Richard Weston (botanist) =

Richard Weston (1733 – 20 October 1806) was a British botanist.

== Life and work ==
Weston was originally a thread-hosier of Leicester, but in some of his anonymous works describes himself as "a country gentleman". In 1773, he was living at Kensington Gore, but later was living at Leicester where he was secretary of the local agricultural society. From the number of his published works, it is evident he had a very wide knowledge of plants and plant literature.

His first major work "Tracts on Practical Agriculture and Gardening", which contained a catalogue of English writers on husbandry gardening and botany, was published in 1769 and dedicated to the Society of Arts. He wrote two multi-part works with Latin names, the Botanicu Universalis and the Flora Anglicana and a number of smaller works, as well as articles in the Gentleman's Magazine. He also published works on the history and literature of Leicester.

In the 1804 Repertory of arts, manufactures and agriculture, Weston published one of his latest articles on the "Valuable fossil as a manure", about the appearance of articles in the Annals of Agriculture on new manures based on the researches of Johann Friedrich Mayer, a German clergyman and agricultural reformer.

== Selected publications ==
In the second part of the 18th century, Weston published many writings. A selection:

- Tracts on Practical Agriculture and Gardening 1769
- Botanicus Universalis et Hortulanus - 4 volumes 1770 - 1777
- Flora Anglicana... - 2 parts 1775 and 1780
- The Gardener's and Planter's Calendar 1773, 2nd ed. 1778
- The Gentleman's and Lady's Gardener 1774
- The Gardener's Pocket Calendar 1774
- Ellis's Gardener's Calendar 1774
- The Nurseryman and Seedsman's Catalogue of Trees Shrubs, Plants and Seeds 1774
- A New and Cheap Manure 1791
- The Leicester Directory 1794
