= Carl Wilhelm Hahn =

German zoologist

Carl Wilhelm Hahn (Lat. Carolus Guilielmus Hahn, 16 December 1786 – 7 November 1835) was a German zoologist and author of the first German monograph on spiders. C. W. Hahn was an all-round natural scientist – not at all unusual for his time. Surprisingly, he seems to have been almost forgotten. Even the few biographical dates that have been published in secondary literature are not always correct as clarified by P. Sacher in his "attempt at a Biography".

C. W. Hahn's signature from 1819

== Life and lifework ==
Carl Wilhelm Christian Hahn was born in Weingartsgreuth, Upper Franconia, as the first son of Johann Michael Hahn (1734–1824), who was court and palace gardener on the estate of Baron von Seckendorff, later palace gardener for Count Friedrich von Pückler. He obeyed the general call to arms as early as 1813, and served as a quartermaster, and in 1816, received his honourable discharge. Afterwards, he lived with his parents in Fürth, and according to Hahn, made up his mind to devote his life to his predilection for natural history, an interest he had possessed since early childhood and which intensified during his studies in Erlangen. He commenced work on his first ornithological work, Birds from Asia, Africa, America and New Holland. When his "often promised and well earned position" failed to materialize, Hahn undertook what was for that time, in his field, a very unusual step and went freelance. From then on, he called himself a natural historian and occasionally also a scholar. On 24 February 1820, having in the meantime qualified as a Dr. Phil. at the University of Erlangen, he married Victoria Francisca Kaltdorff, née Schaefer. His wife, the widow of a doctor of medicine, was about five years older than he, and had three children by her previous marriage. She was at this time without means, but was expecting quite large inheritance from her maternal uncle before long. Their own child, Anna Friedericke, was born at the end of 1820 or 1821.

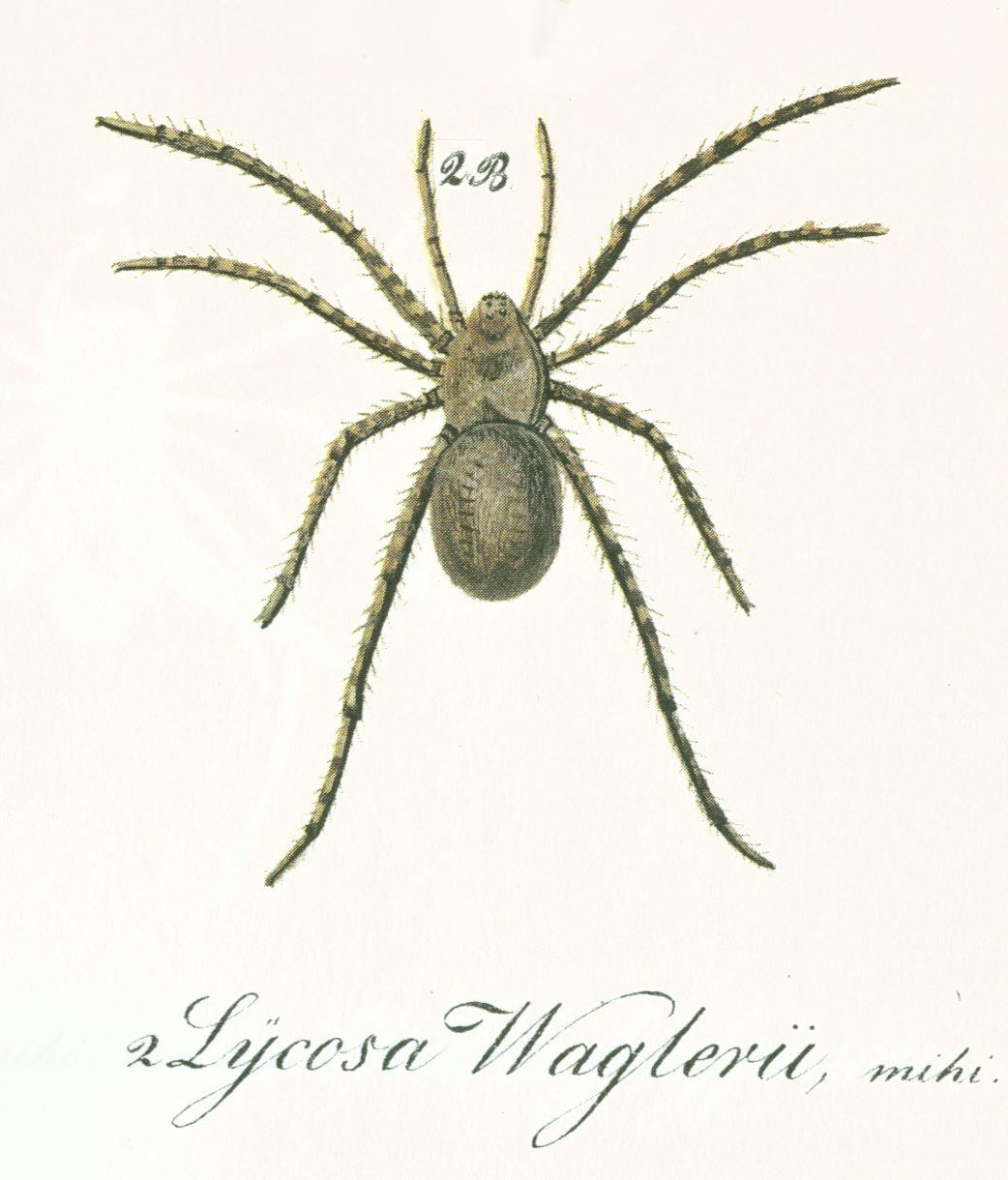
"Lÿcosa Waglerii, mihi" sensu Hahn 1822, Installment 3, Table 3

Hahn is assumed to have been in close contact with the universally known natural scientist Jakob Sturm, and probably with his two sons. He named a spider species after Jakob: Araneus Sturmii, now Atea sturmi (Hahn, 1831). His relationship with Johann Georg Wagler must have been similarly close. He also named a spider species after him: Lÿcosa Waglerii, now Pardosa wagleri (Hahn, 1822). Nothing reliable is known about other contacts within the remarkably productive Nuremberg zoologist scene, nor does any proof exist that Hahn knew Franz von Paula (von) Schrank personally, a highly regarded natural scientist, to whom he dedicated the "Monograph on Spiders". The scientific value of Hahn's lifework in natural history varies. His ornithological work, for example, never had any discernible influence on this field. Hahn's work on the true bugs (Heteroptera), though, is just as important as his works on spiders (Araneae). One species of bug even carries his name: Lopus hahni Stål, 1860. He was also given this honour in the field of arachnology: Carl Ludwig Koch, who continued "Die Arachniden" after Hahn's death, called a genus after him in 1841 (Hahnia), on which later the name of the whole family was based – Hahniidae Bertkau, 1878.

Hahn died in Nuremberg on 7 November 1835, "of a lung complaint in the prime of life".

=== Monographie der Spinnen – Monograph on Spiders ===
About the rarity of the work - today, only about 14 – partially incomplete – copies are known. They were recorded and examined by Sacher from Germany (Wittenberg, Berlin, Jena, Darmstadt, Erlangen, Kiel, Munich, Frankfurt/M.), England (London), U.S.A. (Cambridge/Mass.), Austria (Vienna), and France (Paris). "Monographie der Spinnen" has become a rarity already at the beginning of the 20th century. This rarity is because only small editions were produced: "More than a hundred copies of each installment will not be produced.", remarked Hahn on this subject in 1820. The great rarity of complete copies probably results primarily from the long gap between installments. Ascertaining whether Hahn broke with his publisher or Lechner with him has not been possible, but a separation took place some time before the publication of the sixth installment. Indeed, in 1831, the first installment of "Die Arachniden" had already appeared in Zeh's Bookshop in Nuremberg as an obvious substitute for the "Monographie der Spinnen". It was more accessible, thus also better known than the "Monographie der Spinnen". In the sixth installment of the "Monographie der Spinnen", publisher Lechner 1831 inserted a small-format "message", which announced that Hahn had been relieved as editor. Probably the contents of the sixth installment still can be wholly attributed to Hahn, though he had only admitted to the first five installments. For obvious reasons, Lechner was not in a position to print anything new, though he still had original drawings in his possession, which he published without Hahn's consent. For this reason alone, competing with Hahn's new project was already impossible. So not surprisingly, the promised ninth installment failed to appear.

In the past, some confusion arose regarding the year of publication, particularly of the installments 2, 5, and 7, probably caused both by the partial absence of dated forewords and of dust jackets for the individual installments, as by the fact, that the bookshop and later (1822) publisher, Lechner did not only provide installments that were sold later with a nonoriginal cover, but in a good many cases also overwrote the year of publication with the year of sale. On basis of recent investigation, the correlation between installments and the years of publication has been clarified as:

| Installment | 1 | 2 | 3 | 4 | 5 | 6 | 7 | 8 |
| Year of publication | 1820 | 1821 | 1822 | 1826 | 1827 | 1831 | 1833 | 1836 |

A definitive representative copy of "Monographie der Spinnen" probably does not exist (any more). The available copies differ in several features as detailed pointed out by Sacher. For this reason, it was used a combined version for the reprint of 1988.

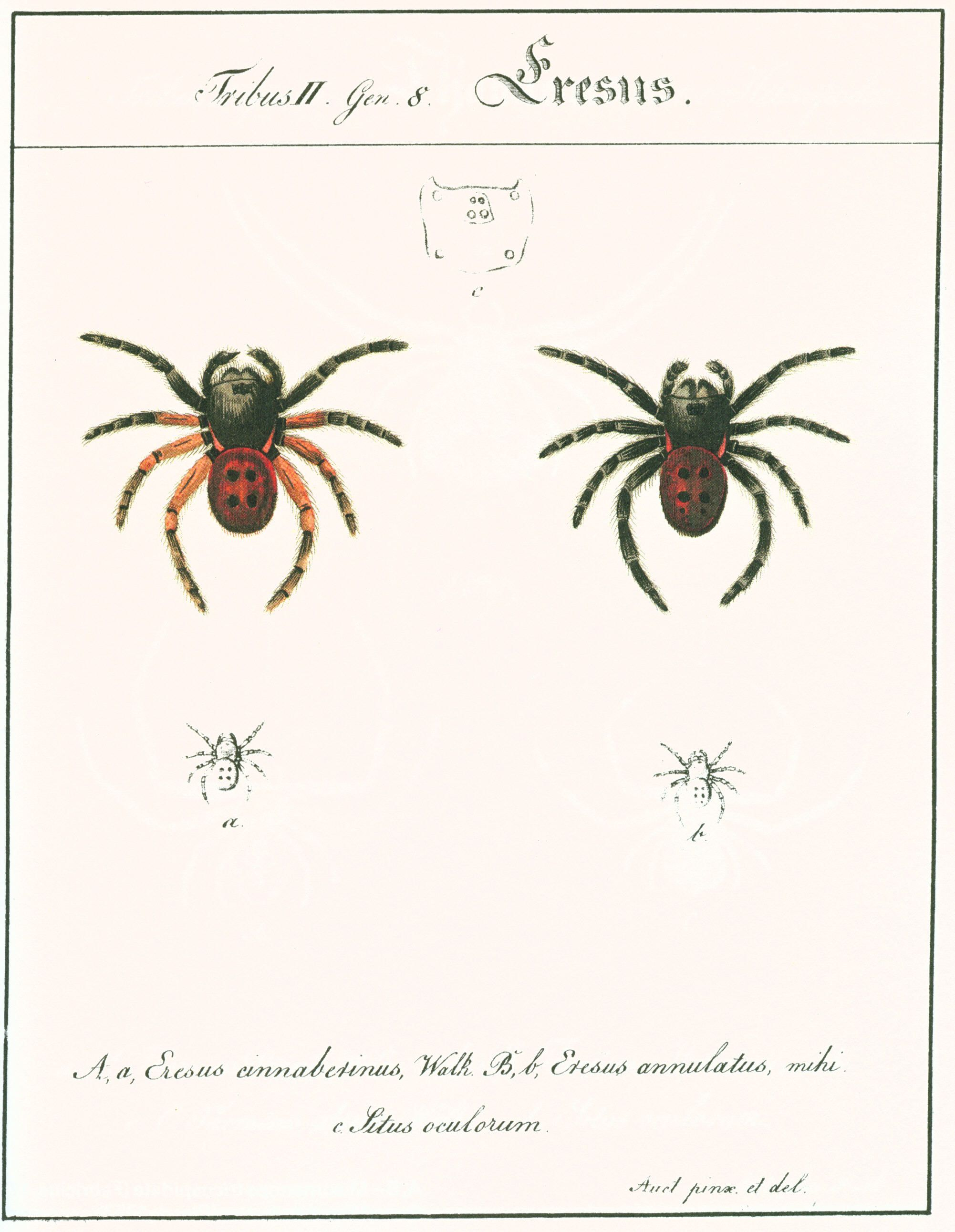
"Eresus cinnaberinus, Walk." and Eresus annulatus, mihi sensu, Hahn 1821, installment 2

"Monographie der Spinnen", though, is far more than just a bibliophilic work.

Firstly, it includes nine still-valid first descriptions of spider species. In the 19th century not unusually, a majority of "new species" had been previously described by other authors, because in contrast to the modern differentiation of species, the genital structures were not taken into consideration at that time. For that reason, smaller differences in the colourings and markings have possibly given rise to different species designations. At any rate, a sixth of the forms described by Hahn are still valid today. That Hahn was a good observer and gave exact descriptions is shown clearly by the example of Eresus annulatus (= E. sandaliatus (Martini & Goeze>, 1778)) and E. cinnaberinus (= E. kollari Rossi, 1846). After more than 150 years, arachnologists follow his separation of these taxa today again.

Secondly, its monographic character is remarkable. It is the first monographic work for spiders in the German language. Further, 180 years ago, using a group such as spiders as a sole subject of a book was very unusual. Apart from a natural history of spiders by Frenchman <Walckenaer in 1806, no work of that time has exclusively had spiders as its subject.

Thirdly, spider illustrations in the "Monographie der Spinnen" show Hahn to be an above-average artist and lithographer.

Finally, "Monographie der Spinnen" and "Die Arachniden" are different ways of carrying out the same project and they can both be considered as autonomous works, whereas Brignoli – an important cataloguer in arachnology – regarded "Monographie der Spinnen" only as a sort of blueprint for "Die Arachniden".

=== Die Arachniden ===
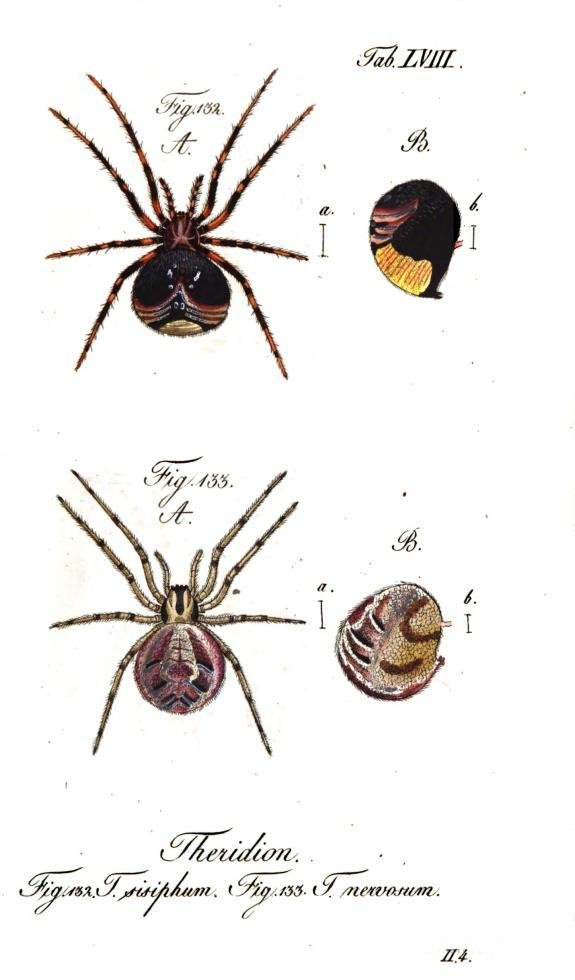
Theridion sisyphium (Clerck, 1757) from Die Arachniden by C. W. Hahn 1834 sub T. sisyphum and T. nervosum

Until the end of the 18th century, all studies of spiders, scorpions, and related forms were treated as part of the wider study of entomology, for these were described as wingless insects and included in one genus, the Aranea of Linnaeus, of perhaps 500 different species. Based on Walckenaer's "Fauna Parisienne" (1802) Latreille established the first set of genera for spiders in his work, which is marking the real beginning of arachnological systematics, and which was extended by Walckenaer into the important "Histoire naturelle des Insectes Aptères" (1837–1847). During the mid-19th century, the centre of activity shifted away from France to Germany. An important part of this shift was due to the 14-volume work of Hahn and C. L. Koch, "Die Arachniden" (1831–1848). In contrast to the French manuscripts with their terse descriptions and infrequent illustrations, the 2000-plus pages of beautifully coloured plates of this work captured the attention of zoologists everywhere. French arachnologist Simon was incited by the high number of species, described from Germany in "Die Arachniden", while from his native France almost nothing had been done. In particular, "Die Arachniden" was very influential in founding a German tradition of active interest in arachnology, which flourished for nearly a century. Its major shortcoming, as was realized later, was the lack of a natural scheme of classification, particularly above the family level.

=== Complete list of works ===
(all illustrated by Hahn himself)

- Voegel(,) aus Asien, Africa, America, und Neuholland, in Abbildungen nach der Natur mit Beschreibungen. 19 installments, Lechner: Nuremberg, 1818–1836.
- Monographia Aranearum – Monographie der Spinnen. 8 installments, Lechner: Nuremberg, 1820–1836.
- Naturgetreue Abbildungen zur allgemeinnützigen Naturgeschichte der Thiere Bayerns. Author: Nuremberg, 1826–1828.
- Icones ad monographiam Cimicum Nurnberg, Lechner, 1826. (PDF)
- (together with Jacob Ernst von Reider Fauna Boica, oder gemeinnützige Naturgeschichte der Thiere Bayerns. Zeh: Nuremberg, 1830–1835.
- Die Arachniden. Getreu nach der Natur abgebildet und beschrieben. 2 volumes, Zeh: Nuremberg, 1831–1834 (from the 3rd volume onwards continued by C. L. Koch).
- Die wanzenartigen Insecten. Getreu nach der Natur abgebildet und beschrieben. 3 volumes, Zeh: Nuremberg, 1831–1835 (from the 4th volume onwards continued by G. A. W. Herrich-Schäffer).
- Gründliche Anweisung Krustenthiere, Vielfüße, Asseln, Arachniden und Insecten aller Klassen zu sammeln, zu präpariren, aufzubewahren und zu versenden. Zeh: Nuremberg, 1834.
- Ornithologischer Atlas oder naturgetreue Abbildung und Beschreibung der aussereuropäischen Vögel. 6 installments, Zeh: Nuremberg 1834–1836 (continued by H. C. Küster).
- Icones Orthopterorum. Abbildungen der hautflügeligen Insecten. 1 installment, Lechner: Nuremberg, 1835.

== About C. W. Hahn ==
- "This person is indeed extremely foolish, but is incidentally polite, draws exceedingly well, has a beautiful hand, has much knowledge of natural history and botany, and is skilled in stuffing birds. However, because of his foolishness, he requires strict supervision. His other talents and capabilities make him worthy of some consideration.", Count Pückler in 1805 to colonel of the infantry regiment, Erbach von Henneberg.
