= Jacob Ernst von Reider =

German zoologist and botanist

Jacob Ernst von Reider (1784 – December 1853 in Ludwigsstadt, Bavaria) was a German zoologist and botanist.

Reider wrote "Fauna Boica, oder gemeinnützige Naturgeschichte der Thiere Bayerns" (Zeh Nuremberg, 1830–1835) with Carl Wilhelm Hahn and "Gartenbau als die höchste Kultur des Grund und Bodens in Deutschland" (Leipzig 1821). He was a prolific writer on agriculture and horticulture, publishing treatises on flax, sugar substitutes, tobacco, hops, fruit trees, cactus, viticulture, medicinal plants, various flowers and ornamental plants, et al.
