= Reichenow-Möglin =

- Municipality
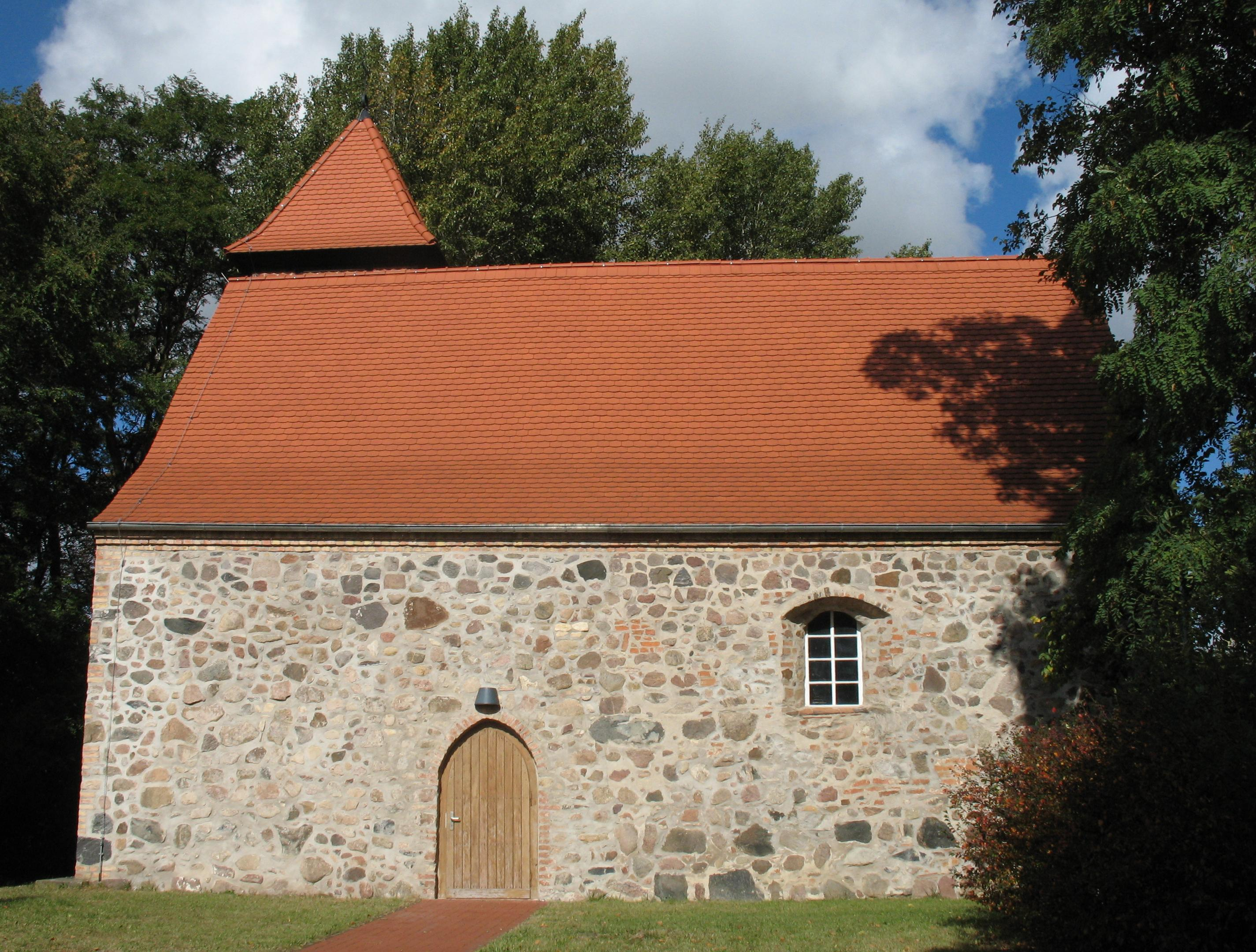
- Church

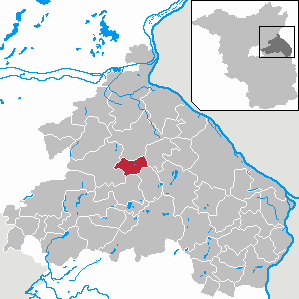
- Location of Reichenow-Möglin within Märkisch-Oderland district
- Interactive map of Reichenow-Möglin
- Location within Germany Location within Brandenburg
- Coordinates: 52°40′00″N 14°05′59″E
- Country: Germany
- State: Brandenburg
- District: Märkisch-Oderland
- Municipal assoc.: Barnim-Oderbruch
- Subdivisions: 2 Ortsteile

Government
  - Mayor (2024–29): Wolf-Dieter Hickstein (Ind.)

Area
  - Total: 22.76 km^{2} (8.79 sq mi)
- Elevation: 61 m (200 ft)

Population (2025-12-31)
  - Total: 562
  - Density: 24.7/km^{2} (64.0/sq mi)
- Time zone: UTC+01:00 (CET)
  - Summer (DST): UTC+02:00 (CEST)
- Postal codes: 15345
- Dialling codes: 033437, 033456
- Vehicle registration: MOL

Reichenow-Möglin is a municipality in the district Märkisch-Oderland, in Brandenburg, Germany.

== History ==
On 31 December 1997, the municipality of Reichenow-Möglin was formed by merging the municipalities of Reichenow and Möglin.

From 1815 to 1947, Reichenow and Möglin were part of the Prussian Province of Brandenburg, from 1947 to 1952 of the State of Brandenburg, from 1952 to 1990 of the Bezirk Frankfurt of East Germany and since 1990 again of Brandenburg, since 1997 united as Reichenow-Möglin.

== Demography ==
Development of Population since 1875 within the Current Boundaries (Blue Line: Population; Dotted Line: Comparison to Population Development of Brandenburg state; Grey Background: Time of Nazi rule; Red Background: Time of Communist rule)

Reichenow-Möglin: Population development
within the current boundaries (2013)

Year	Pop.	±% p.a.
1875	733	—
1890	643	−0.87%
1910	632	−0.09%
1925	673	+0.42%
1933	633	−0.76%
1939	652	+0.49%
1946	923	+5.09%
1950	1,157	+5.81%
1964	865	−2.06%
1971	898	+0.54%
1981	718	−2.21%
1985	682	−1.28%
1989	633	−1.85%
1990	634	+0.16%
1991	632	−0.32%
1992	633	+0.16%
1993	609	−3.79%
1994	600	−1.48%
1995	617	+2.83%
1996	626	+1.46%

Year	Pop.	±% p.a.
1997	630	+0.64%
1998	626	−0.63%
1999	644	+2.88%
2000	667	+3.57%
2001	681	+2.10%
2002	664	−2.50%
2003	649	−2.26%
2004	634	−2.31%
2005	624	−1.58%
2006	619	−0.80%
2007	626	+1.13%
2008	615	−1.76%
2009	600	−2.44%
2010	595	−0.83%
2011	569	−4.37%
2012	554	−2.64%
2013	562	+1.44%
2014	564	+0.36%
2015	549	−2.66%
2016	547	−0.36%
