= Gondola chair =

Chair type

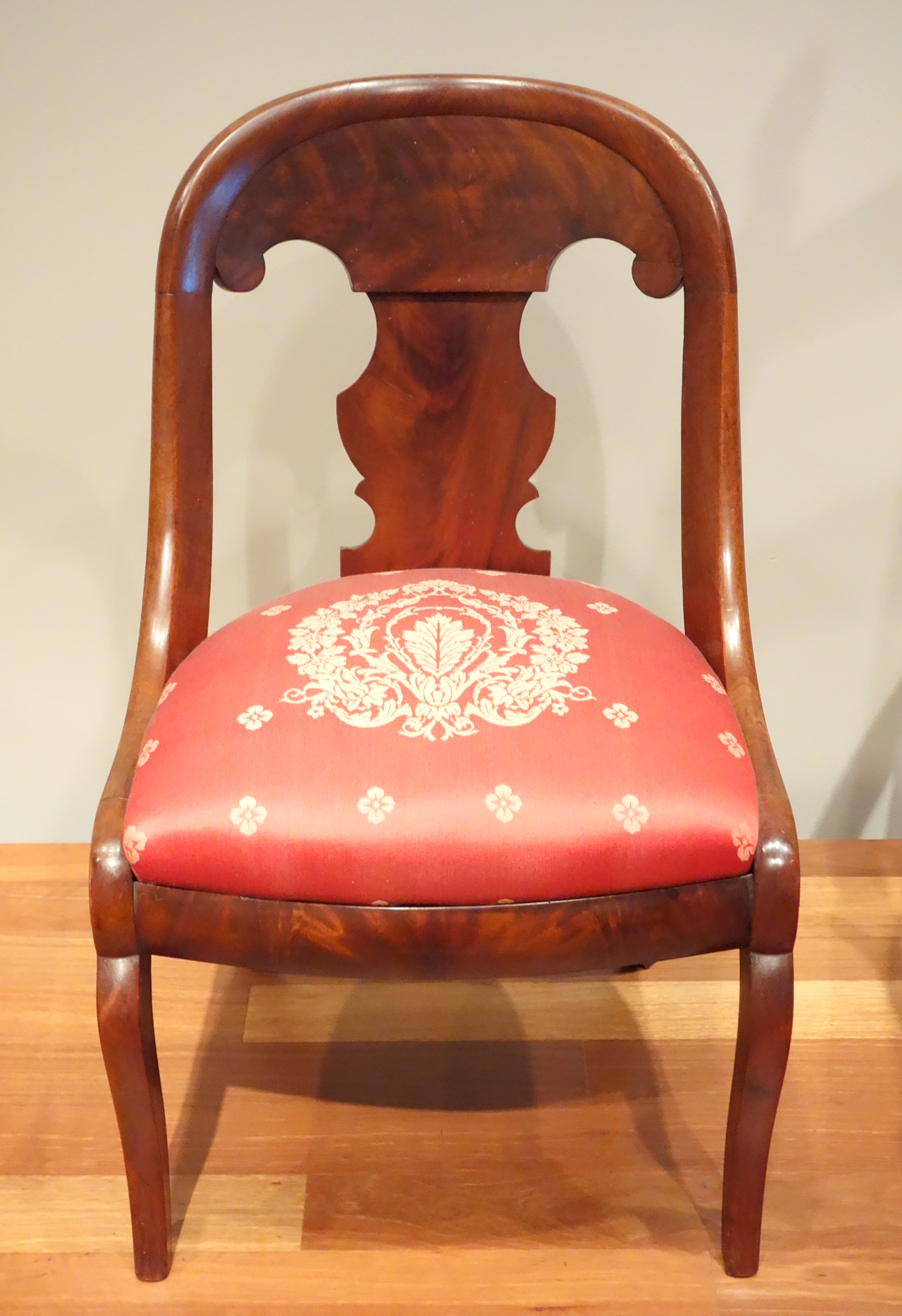
A gondola chair made about 1820.

Gondola chairs are a type of low chair, often used at a writing desk, with a downward curved back that forms the arms of the chair. The Gondola chair is named after the 18th-Century Venetian gondola row boats which have a similar curvilinear shape.
