= Junior Constitutional Club =

London gentlemen's club

Coordinates: 51.50530°N 0.14606°W

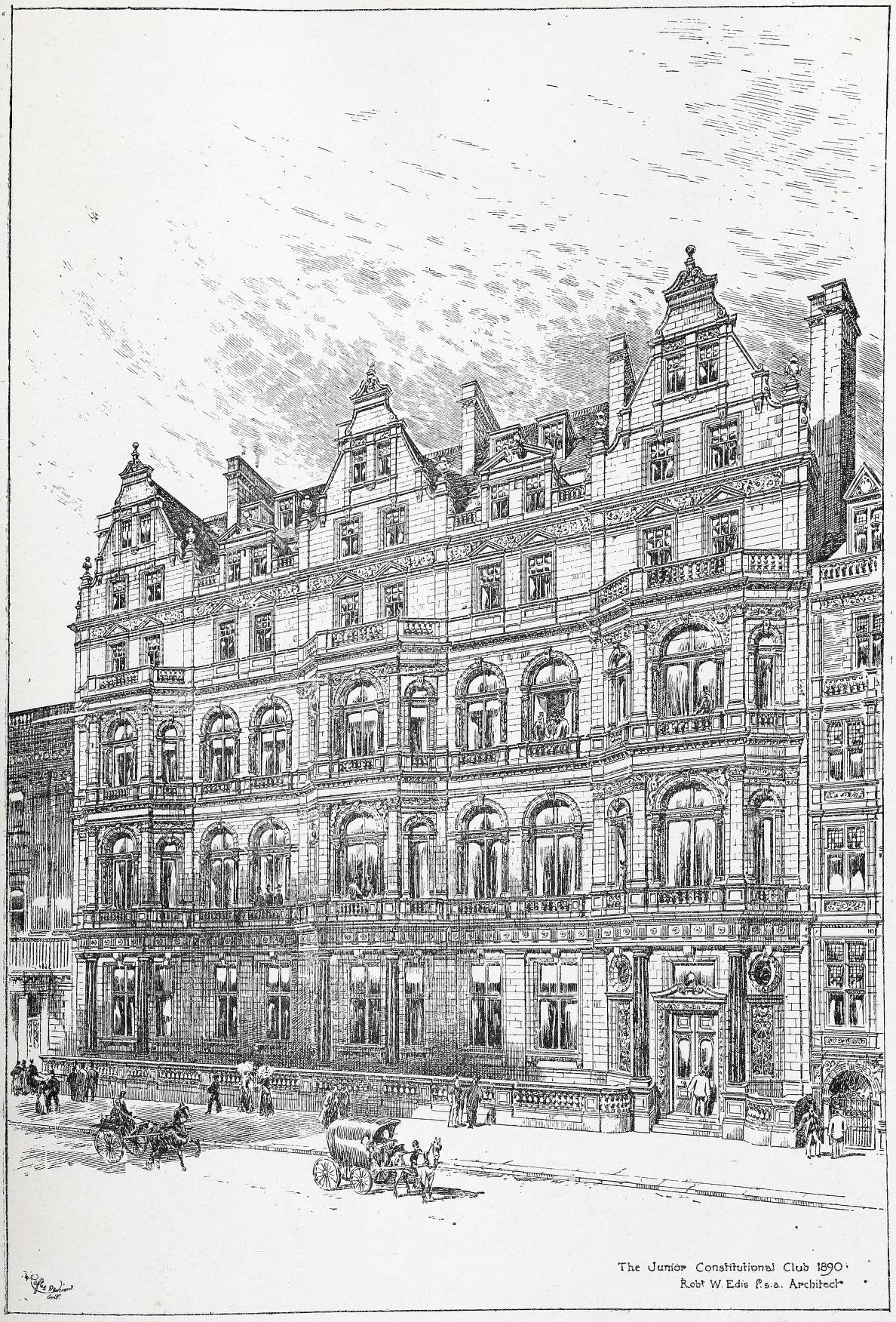
The 1890 clubhouse at 101 Piccadilly, designed by Robert William Edis

The Junior Constitutional Club was a political London gentlemen's club founded in 1887, and located at 101 Piccadilly. It was aligned to the Conservative party, with members having to pledge support. Heavy over-subscription for the Constitutional Club which had opened in 1883 led to the creation of a further mass-membership Conservative club.

By 1890, it was reported by Whittakers Almanack to have 10,000 members, making it one of the largest clubs in history, but this level of membership proved to be short-lived; by 1890 its membership had halved to around the 5,500 level, and by 1900 it was still slightly further down, at 5,000. It had closed by 1904, when its building was taken over by the pro-Tariff Reform United Empire Club.

== See also ==
- List of London's gentlemen's clubs
