= Anglo-Belgian Club =

Private members' club in London, England

Coordinates: 51°30′25″N 0°7′34″W

The Anglo-Belgian Club
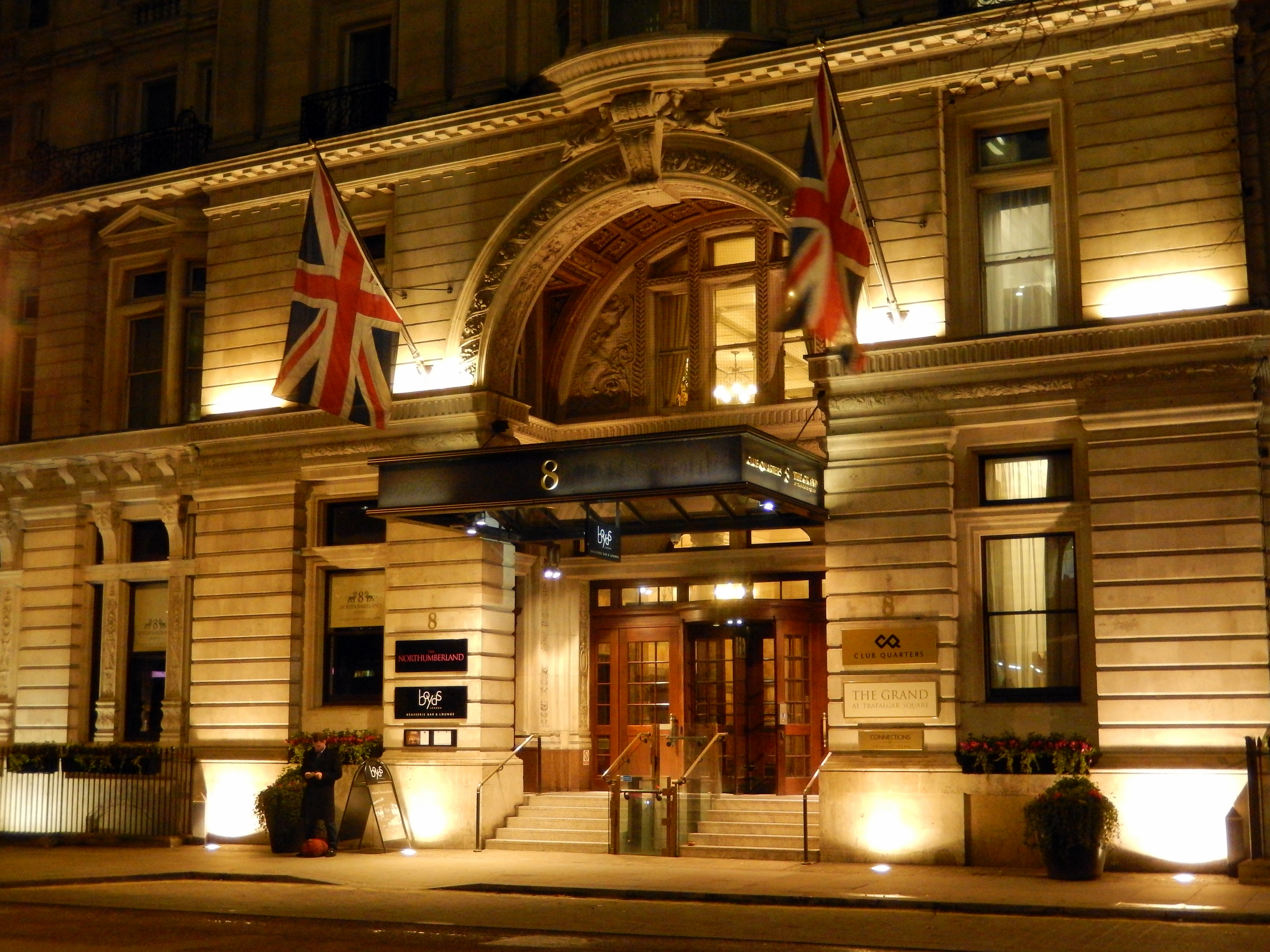
- 8 Northumberland Avenue in 2014
- Abbreviation: ABC
- Formation: 1942
- Dissolved: 2012
- Type: Private members' club
- Purpose: Club for Belgian expatriates
- Headquarters: 8 Northumberland Avenue, London WC2N 5BY
- President: Prince Philippe of Belgium
- Website: www.anglobelgianclub.com

The Anglo-Belgian Club (formerly the Royal Anglo-Belgian Club) was a private members' club located in Northumberland Avenue, London.

== History ==
The club's roots can be traced to 1942, when the Belgian government in exile founded the Belgian Institute in Belgrave Square, to promote understanding of the country during the Second World War. After the war, the Institute evolved into the Royal Anglo-Belgian Club. At the end of the lease on the Belgrave Square house in 1978, the Club became associated with the Royal Thames Yacht Club, sharing the latter's modern premises at 60 Knightsbridge. The joint RTYC-ABC clubhouse had an impressive first-floor dining room looking out over Hyde Park. On 1 July 2010, the Anglo-Belgian Club moved to another Club House near Trafalgar Square, which it shared with a hotel belonging to Club Quarters. The Club closed its doors at the end of June 2012. Its social, cultural and sporting activities were taken over by the Anglo-Belgian Society.

== Membership ==
The club was open to both men and women and had about 400 members, who were predominantly either Belgian citizens living in the United Kingdom or British citizens with Belgian connections. The final President of the Anglo-Belgian Club was Prince Philippe of Belgium.

As of 2011, membership cost £330 per year, with a £249 rate for younger members and £185 for senior members. A joining fee of £100 was charged in the first year.

== See also ==
- List of London's gentlemen's clubs
