= City University Club =

Gentlemen's club in London, England

Coordinates: 51.5113°N 0.0786°W

The City University Club (often abbreviated CUC) is a private lunch and social gentlemen's club in the City of London, England. It was established in 1895 and historically served graduates of Oxford and Cambridge working in the City. Over time, its membership base broadened, and in 2018 the club relocated to new premises. Since then, CUC is located within walking distance to the Bank of England, the Tower of London and Lloyd's insurance, whose members club was merged into CUC.

== History ==
The City University Club was founded in 1895 by a group of Oxford and Cambridge graduates who wished to establish a "lunch club" in the City of London for those working in the financial district. From its foundation, the club occupied the top three floors of 50 Cornhill, in what was then Prescott’s Bank (a 1766 private bank building later absorbed into the NatWest group). That arrangement continued until January 2018, when the club moved to 42 Crutched Friars, London — a site previously occupied by the Lloyds Club. The new premises are historically significant: the building had formerly been the residence of the Spanish Ambassador in the late 18th century. The membership of Lloyds Club was merged into the City Club and the new premises where better located with 'approximately 300 yards east of [...] Lloyd’s and a similar distance from the Tower of London'.

It is generally accepted that the merger and move gave City University Club access to larger premises in a central City location, better suited for the club's aspirations.

Although the club's name includes the word "City University", it has never had any formal connection with City, University of London.

== Membership and Activities ==
It was founded strictly for graduates of Oxford and Cambridge universities who worked in the city, but membership is now also open to those who work in the area. It provides club facilities at lunchtime, dinners several times a month, and space for private occasions. In 2025 Princess Olga Andreevna Romanoff was amongst the speakers and organisers of the Russian Dinner. The club serves as a lunch club for "brokers, bankers and lawyers".

The club has reciprocal arrangements with over 450 private members clubs around the world, enabling members to use facilities in these clubs:

=== London (excerpt) ===
- Oxford and Cambridge Club
- Buck’s Club
- Eccentric Club
- Royal Over-Seas League

=== England & Ireland (excerpt) ===
- Royal Dublin Society
- Hawks' Club
- University Pitt Club
- Vincent's Club
- The Gridiron Club (Oxford University)

=== Overseas (excerpt) ===
- Tokyo Club
- Hong Kong Savage Club
- The British Club Singapore
- City Club of San Francisco
- The Penn Club New York
- The George Town Club
- International Club Berlin
- Wiener Rennverein Austria

== Notable Members ==
Notable members included:

- Prince Arthur, Duke of Connaught and Strathearn
- Sir Chips Keswick (merchant banker)
- Ian Posgate (Lloyd’s underwriter)
- Evelyn Waugh (writer)

== See also ==
- List of London's gentlemen's clubs
