= List of members' clubs in London =

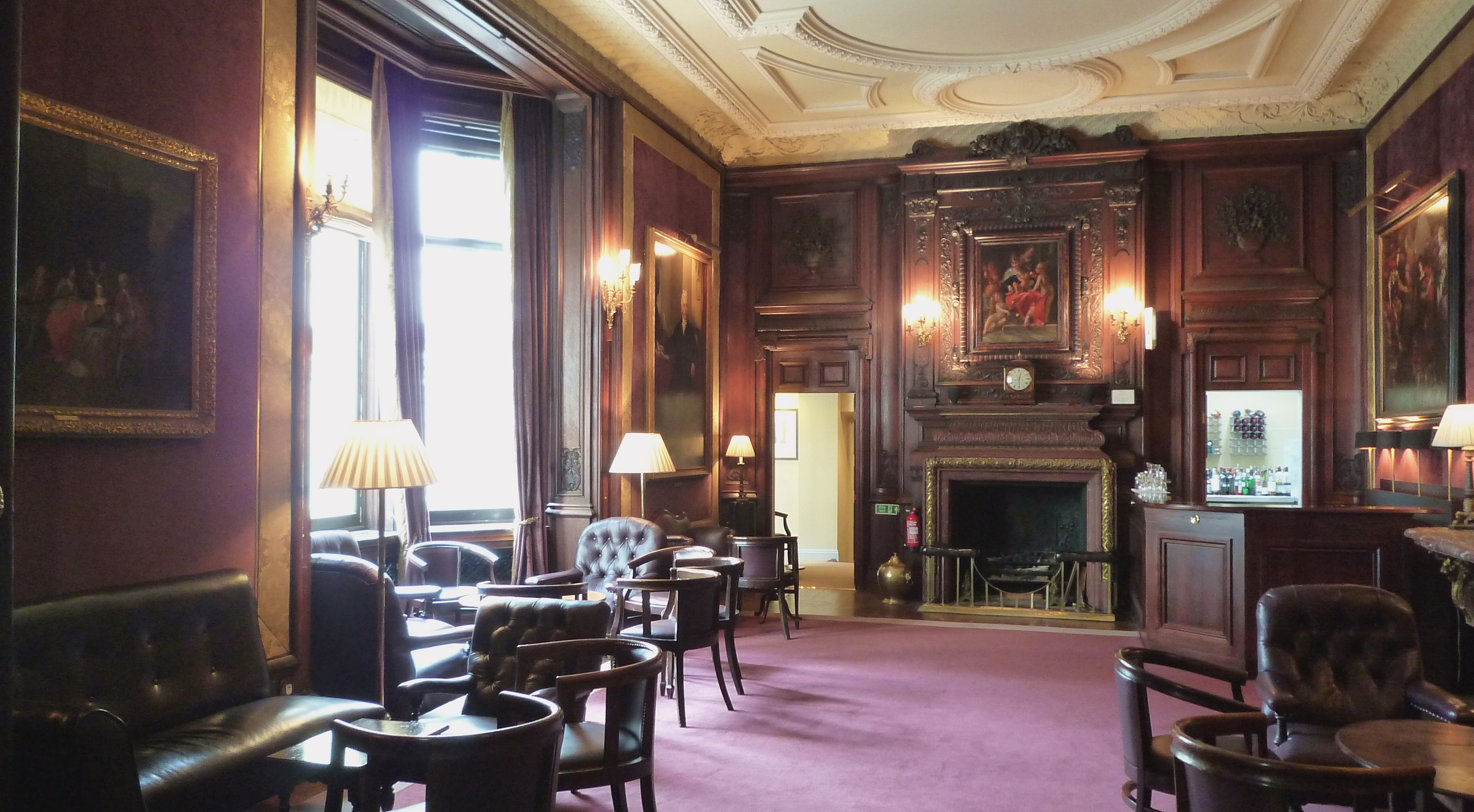
The members' bar at the Savile Club

This is a list of members' clubs in London, which is not complete. It includes private members' clubs with physical premises in London, England, as well as those that no longer exist or have merged. There is an additional section for clubs that appear in fiction. Most of these clubs were originally gentlemen's clubs with membership restricted to men, but the majority now admit women as well, and a number of women-only clubs also exist.

== Extant clubs ==
Name	Est.	Location	Located Since	Affiliation	Admission of women
Alpine Club	1857	55–56 Charlotte Road, Shoreditch	1991	Mountaineering	Since 1975
Annabel's	1963	46 Berkeley Square	2018	Social	Admitted
Army and Navy Club	1837	36–39 Pall Mall	1963	British Army and Royal Navy (Note: Including Royal Marines) officers	Since 1995
Arts Club	1863	40 Dover Street	1896	The arts, literature, science	Since 1996
The Athenaeum	1824	107 Pall Mall	1830	The sciences, law, medicine, arts, literature, and the Church	Since 2002
Authors' Club	1891	1 Whitehall Place, sharing the premises of the National Liberal Club	2014	Literature	Since 1971
Bath & Racquets Club	1989	49 Brook's Mews, W1K 4EB	1989	Sports	No women members
Beefsteak Club	1876	9 Irving Street, near Leicester Square	1876	Aristocratic; Social; Tory	No women members
Boodle's	1762	28 St James's Street	1782	Aristocratic; Tory	No women members
Brooks's	1764	60 St James's Street	1778	Aristocratic; Whig	No women members
Buck's Club	1919	18 Clifford Street, Mayfair	1919	Social	No women members
Caledonian Club	1891	9 Halkin Street, Belgravia	1946	Scottish	Since 2011
Canning Club (formerly the Argentine Club)	1911 (renamed 1948)	4 St James's Square, sharing the premises of the Naval and Military Club	1999	Social; Latin America, Spain, Portugal	Admitted
Carlton Club	1832	69 St James's Street	1943	Political; Tory, latterly Conservative	Since 2008
Cavalry and Guards Club (the merged Cavalry Club and Guards Club)	1810 (Guards' Club); 1890 (Cavalry Club); 1976 (merged club)	127 Piccadilly	1908	Cavalry and Guards, latterly officers of other British Army regiments	Since 1994
Chelsea Arts Club	1890	143 Old Church Street, Chelsea	1990	The arts	Since 1966
City Livery Club	1914	Bell Wharf Lane, Upper Thames Street, sharing the premises of the Little Ship Club	2023	The City	Admitted
City of London Club	1832	19 Old Broad Street, London	1834	City professions	Since 2011
City University Club	1895	42 Crutched Friars	2018	The City, Oxbridge graduates	Since 1994
Civil Service Club	1953	13-15 Great Scotland Yard	1953	Civil Service and Diplomatic Service	Since beginning
The Conduit	2018	6 Langley St, Covent Garden, WC2H 9JA	2018	Business, social, sustainability	Admitted
East India Club (in full: The East India, Devonshire, Sports and Public Schools' Club)	1849	16 St James's Square	1866	Originally for East India Company, since 1972 merger with the Public Schools' Club primarily aligned with public schools	No women members
Eccentric Club	2008	48 Greek Street, Soho, sharing the premises of The Snail Club	2023	Social; eccentricity and philanthropy	Since 1984 (former club)
English-Speaking Union	1918	Dartmouth House, 37 Charles Street	1926	Philanthropy	Admitted
Farmers Club	1842	3 Whitehall Court	1942	Agriculture and landowning	Since 1975
Flyfishers' Club	1884	69 Brook Street, sharing the premises of the Savile Club	1995	Flyfishing	Since 2024
Garrick Club	1831	15 Garrick Street, Covent Garden	1864	The arts and theatre	Since 2024
George	2001	87-88 Mount Street, London	2001	Social	Admitted
Groucho Club	1985	45 Dean Street, London, W1D 4QB	1985	Media	Admitted
Harry's Bar	1979	26 South Audley Street	1979	Social	Admitted
Home House	1998	20-21 Portman Square, London, W1H 6LW	1998	Social; eccentricity and philanthropy	Admitted
Honourable Artillery Company	1537	Armoury House, City Road, EC1Y 2BQ	1735	Serving and veteran members of the British Army regiment and Police Special Constabulary of the same name	Admitted
Hurlingham Club	1869	Ranelagh Gardens, Fulham	1869	Sports; tennis and crocquet	Since 1946
Lansdowne Club	1935	9 Fitzmaurice Place, Berkeley Square	1935	Social	Since beginning
Little Ship Club	1926	Bell Wharf Lane, London EC4R 3TB	1962	Yachting	Since 1927
London Sketch Club	1898	7 Dilke Street, Chelsea	1957	Sketch artists	Since 2022
Mark's Club	1972	46 Charles Street, Mayfair	1972	Social	Admitted
Marylebone Cricket Club (MCC)	1787	Lord's, St John's Wood	1814	Cricket and Real tennis; formerly headquarters of ICC	Since 1998
National Liberal Club (NLC)	1882	1 Whitehall Place	1887	Political; Liberal	Since 1976
Naval and Military Club	1862	4 St James's Square	1999	Royal Navy (Note: Including Royal Marines) and British Army officers	Since 1999
Den Norske Klub	1887	4 St James's Square, sharing the premises of the Naval and Military Club	1999	Norway	Since 1982
Oriental Club	1824	Stratford House, Stratford Place	1962	Founded for members of the East India Company; now social	Since 2010
Oxford and Cambridge Club (called the United Oxford and Cambridge Club, 1971–2001)	1821 (United University Club); 1830 (Oxford and Cambridge Club); 1971 (merged club)	71–76 Pall Mall	1837	Members of Oxford and Cambridge Universities	Since 1996
Portland Club	1814	36–39 Pall Mall, sharing the premises of the Army & Navy Club	1990s	Cards	No women members
Pratt's	1857	14 Park Place, St James's	1857	Aristocratic; Tory	Since 2023
Queen's Club	1886	Palliser Road, West Kensington	1892	Sports	Admitted
Reform Club	1836	103–105 Pall Mall	1841	Originally political (Liberal), now social. Members still sign a declaration agreeing to the principles of the 1832 Reform Act.	Since 1981
Roehampton Club	1901	Roehampton Lane, Roehampton	1901 (site); 1960s (buildings)	Sports	Since beginning
Royal Air Force Club	1918	128 Piccadilly	1922	Royal Air Force officers	Since 1966
Royal Automobile Club	1897	89–91 Pall Mall	1911	Social and automobile enthusiasts	Since 1998
Royal Ocean Racing Club	1925	20 St James's Place, St James's Street	1942	Yachting enthusiasts	Since beginning
Royal Kennel Club	1873	10 Clarges Street	2015	Canine activities	Since 1979
Royal Over-Seas League (formerly the Over-Seas Club)	1910	6 Park Place, St James's	1921	Commonwealth citizens, affiliate membership available for other nationalities; music and the arts; travellers.	Since beginning
Royal Society of Medicine	1805	1 Wimpole Street	1910	Medical practitioners	Admitted
Royal Thames Yacht Club	1775	60 Knightsbridge	1952	Yachting enthusiasts	Since beginning
Savage Club	1857	27 Great Queen Street	2025	The arts, science and the law	No women members
Savile Club	1868	69 Brook Street	1927	Conviviality, from the arts to the sciences	No women members
The Sloane Club	1922 (Initially as the Service Women's Club, then The Helena Club)	52 Lower Sloane St, Chelsea	1922	Social	Only women members originally, male members admitted in 1976
The Snail Club	2024	48 Greek Street, Soho	2024	Social	Since beginning
Special Forces Club	1945	8 Herbert Crescent, Knightsbridge	1945	Members of Special Operations Executive, British intelligence and UK Special Forces; foreign special forces, intelligence agencies and senior military officers	Since beginning
Travellers Club	1819	106 Pall Mall	1827	Diplomats, social and business travellers	No women members
Turf Club	1861	5 Carlton House Terrace	1965	Aristocratic; social, equestrianism, sports & cards	No women members
Union Jack Club	1904	Sandell Street, Waterloo, SE1 8UJ	1907	Other ranks (Non-Commissioned/ Enlisted) of HM Armed Forces	Admitted
University Women's Club (originally the University Club for Ladies)	1887	2 Audley Square, Mayfair	1921	University graduates	No male members
Victory Services Club	1907	63–79 Seymour Street, Marylebone	1948	All NATO Army, Navy, Marines and Air Force personnel	Admitted
The Walbrook Club	2000	37a Walbrook EC4N 8BS	2000	City professions	Since beginning
White's	1693	37 St James's Street	1778	Aristocratic; Tory	No women members or visitors
Winchester House Club	1892	10 Lower Richmond Road, Putney	1892	Social	Admitted

== Defunct or merged clubs ==
Name	Established	Clubhouse location (s)	Affiliation	Status
1920 Club	1920	2 Whitehall Court	Political; Liberal	Closed in 1923
Albemarle Club (Ladies and Gentlemen)	1874	13 Albemarle Street (from 1874); 37 Dover Street (by the 1910s); 21 Curzon Street (by the 1940s)	Social	Closed in 1941
Almack's Club (Ladies and Gentlemen)	1765	King Street, St James's (1765–1867)	Social; especially card games	Closed in 1867; a 'refounded' Almack's operated from 1908 to 1961
American Club	1919	95 Piccadilly	American	Closed in the 1980s
Argentine Club	1910	1 Hamilton Place, near Piccadilly	Social	Later became the present-day Canning Club
Arthur's	1827	69 St James's Street	Social; non-political	Closed in 1940. Building later taken over by the Carlton Club; ironic, given its avowedly non-political membership.
Arundel Yacht Club	1838	Coal Hole Tavern, Strand	Yachting enthusiasts	Renamed London Yacht Club 1845. Moved to Cowes, Isle of Wight 1882.
Bachelors' Club	1880	106 Piccadilly	Bachelors	Closed in the late 1940s
Badminton Club	1875	100 Piccadilly	Sports; driving (horses and coaches were owned by the club)	Dissolved in 1938, as by then horse transport was becoming anachronistic; Clubhouse taken over by the Public Schools Club
Bath Club	1894	34 Dover Street (1894–1941); 74 St James's Street (1950–1959); 43 Brook Street (1959–1981)	Sports; the Dover Street club offered a swimming pool with athletic rings over it, and a Victorian Turkish bath.	Original clubhouse bombed in the Blitz. Relocated club closed in 1981 – members dispersed to other Clubs including the Oriental Club
Beaconsfield Club	1880	66–68 Pall Mall (1880–1887)	Political; Conservative	Closed circa 1887/1888; Clubhouse taken over by the Unionist Club
Beefsteak Club	1705	Imperial Phiz public house, Old Jewry	Social; Whig	closed 1712; current premises near Leicester Square
Blenheim Club	1909	12 St James's Square, later King Street	?	?
British Empire Club	1910	12 St James's Square	Facilities for Temporary Honorary Members of Visitors to the United Kingdom	?
Burlington Fine Arts Club	1866	177 Piccadilly (1866–1869); 17 Savile Row (1869–1952)	The arts	Closed in 1952
Cavalry Club	1890	127 Piccadilly	Cavalry officers	Merged with the Guards' Club in 1976 to form the present Cavalry and Guards Club
Cobden Club	1866	?	Political; Free Trade doctrine	Closed in the 1970s
Cocoa Tree Club	1746	St James's St	Tory. Members inc Byron & Gibbon	closed 1932
Commonwealth Club	1868	25 Northumberland Avenue	formerly headquarters of the Royal Commonwealth Society	Closed June 2013. The RCS still exists as a charity.
Conservative Club	1840	88 St James's Street (1841–1845); 74 St James's Street (1841–1950)	Political; Conservative	Merged with the Bath Club in 1950, taking on the name of the Bath Club, but moving to the Conservative Club's premises.
Constitutional Club	1883	28 Northumberland Avenue (1886–1959); 40 Pall Mall, sharing the premises of the Junior Carton Club (1962–1964); 116 Pall Mall, sharing the premises of the United Service Club (1964-late 1960s); St. James's Street (1970s)	Political; Conservative	Closed in 1979; membership merged with the St. Stephen's Club
Cosmopolitan Club	1852	30 Charles Street, Berkeley Square	Social	Closed in 1902
Challoner Club	1951	59 Pont Street, London, SW1	Religious; Catholic Church	Closed in 1997; refounded in 2025 as a private member's club with no permanent location.
Coventry House Club	1846	106 Piccadilly (1846–1854)	Social	Closed on 25 March 1854
Crockford's (officially known as the St James's Club)	1823	50 St James's Street	Social; especially card games	Closed on 1 January 1846; clubhouse taken over by the Military, Naval and County Service Club (1849–1851), and then the Devonshire Club. Re-founded in 1928, closed in 1970.
Devonshire Club	1874	50 St James's Street	Political; initially Liberal but later largely apolitical	Closed in 1976; membership merged with the present East India Club
Eccentric Society Club (1)	1781	Various addresses around Covent Garden	Social	Closed in 1846
Eccentric Society Club (2)	1858	Leicester Square	Social	Closed in 1881
Eccentric Club (3)	1890	9 Ryder Street, St James's	Social	Closed in 1984 for refurbishment, went into liquidation in 1986; in 1985 most members were elected to the present East India Club, and still meet there to this day. In 2008 a group started an endeavour to re-establish the Eccentric Club
Eighty Club	1880	?	Political; Liberal	Closed in the 1900s
Goodenough Club	2001	23 Mecklenburgh Square	Faculty club for Goodenough College (est. 1930)	?
Grace Belgravia	2012	Belgravia	Female-only wellness	Closed in 2019
Green Room Club	1877	10 Adelphi Terrace (1877–1883); 22 King Street, Covent Garden (1883); 20 Bedford Street, near Strand (1883–1903); 46 Leicester Square (1903–1940); Whitcomb Street, near Leicester Square (1940–1954); 8–9 Adam Street, near Strand (1955–2000)	The arts and theatre	Closed in 2000
Gresham Club	1843	1 King William Street (1844–1910s); Gresham Place (early 1910s); 15 Abchurch Lane, near King William Street (1915–1991),	The City; Merchants and bankers	Closed in 1991; members accepted into the City University Club
Guards' Club	1810	49 St. James's Street (1810–1826); 106 Pall Mall (1826–1827); 49 St James's Street (1827–1848); 70 Pall Mall (1848– )	Officers of the Household Cavalry and Grenadier, Coldstream, Scots, Irish, and Welsh regiments of Foot Guards.	Closed in 1976, and merged with the Cavalry Club to form the present Cavalry and Guards Club
Gun Club	Late 19th century?	?	Pigeon hunters	Closed
Hogarth Club	1858	84 Charlotte Street, Fitzrovia	Artists	Closed in 1861
Irish Club	1952	Eaton Square, and latterly Blackfriars		Closed in 2012
Isthmian Club	1882	105 Piccadilly	Rowing, cricket	?
Jockey Club	1750	Pall Mall	Horse racing; primarily for racehorse owners	Still exists today, but has moved out of London to Newmarket
Junior Army and Navy Club	1871	10 St James	Military	Closed in 1904
Junior Athenaeum	1864	116 Piccadilly	The arts, science, or the clergy	Closed
Junior Carlton Club	1866	30 Pall Mall (1868–1968); 94 Pall Mall (1968–1977)	Political; Conservative	Closed in 1977; membership merged with the present Carlton Club
Junior Constitutional Club	1887	101 Piccadilly	Political; Conservative	Closed
Junior Naval and Military Club	1870	19 Dover Street (1870–1875); 66–68 Pall Mall (1875–1979)	Army and Navy officers	The cost of the club's elaborate, purpose-built Pall Mall clubhouse bankrupted the club, and it closed in 1879. The building was then acquired by the Beaconsfield Club.
Junior United Services Club	1827	Charles Street	Military	Closed
King of Clubs	1798–1830?	Crown & Anchor; Freemasons' Tavern; Grillions; Clarendon Hotel	High Whig	?
Marlborough Club	1868–1945	52 Pall Mall	'a convenient and agreeable place of meeting for a Society of Gentlemen'	On 31 December 1945 the Windham, Orleans and Marlborough Clubs amalgamated to form the Marlborough-Windham Club. Rising costs and lack of candidates for admission compelled this club to close in December 1953.
Military, Naval and County Service Club	Nov. 1848	50 St James's Street	active & retired military officers, including East India Company, Militia and Yeomanry.	Founded as the Military and County Service Club, renamed St James's Club c.1850 and dissolved in July 1851. The club used the premises of the former Crockford's Club. Later on the premises were used by the Wellington Dining Rooms, the St George's Club and the Devonshire Club.
The Museum Club	1844	Northumberland Street and then 5 Henrietta Street, Covent Garden	Literary	Dissolved 1849 and replaced with "Hooks and Eyes" and "Our Club"
National Sporting Club	1891	43 King Street, Covent Garden	Sports; Boxing	Closed
National Union	1887	?	Political; Unionist	Closed in the 1890s
Naval Club (formerly RNVR (Auxiliary Patrol) Club (1919–1946), RNVR Club (1946–1969)	1919	38 Hill Street Mayfair	Royal Navy reservists, and later all RN officers	Closed 2021
New Cavendish Club	1920	44 Great Cumberland Place	Social	Closed in 2014
New Travellers Club	1886	96 Piccadilly		Merged into the United Service Club in 1953.
New University Club	1864	57 St James's Street; later 6 St James's Street	Graduates of Oxford and Cambridge	Merged with the United University Club in 1938, which then merged with the Oxford and Cambridge Club in 1971.
Nimrod	1890s	12 St James's Sq predated the Blenheim Club at this address	?	Liquidated 1919
Palace Club	1882	?	Political; Conservative	Closed in the 1900s
Pembridge Club	1868	1, St. Stephen's Square (renamed St. Stephen's Gardens in 1938), Westbourne Grove, Bayswater	The arts	Founded as the Notting Hill and Bayswater Club
Portland Club	c1815 as the Stratford Club; renamed 1825.	Originally, 1 Stratford Place, then 9 St James's Square 1890–1943	Card-playing game club	Now located within the Army & Navy Club
Press Club	1882	Wine Office Court, near Fleet Street	Journalism	Clubhouse closed in 1986. Press Club still exists today as a society, but no longer offers club facilities
Primrose Club	1886	4&5 Park Place, St James's Street	Political; Conservative	Closed in the 1910s
Prince's Club	1853	Hans Place (1853–1886); 197 Knightsbridge (1888–1940s)	Sports. First private club to install a Victorian Turkish bath (1860)	Closed in 1939. Building requisitioned for war effort
Public Schools Club	1863–1868; 17 St James Place; 1909–1915; 1918–1972	13 Albemarle Street (1909–1913); 19 Berkeley Street (1913–1915); Curzon Street (1920–1938); 100 Piccadilly (1938–1972)	Alumni of the British public schools	Merged with the present East India Club on 1 May 1972, now providing the bulk of their membership
Raleigh Club	Late 19th century?	Regent Street	Members had to have served a year in the armed forces, or be an existing member of another club	Closed
Road Club	Late 19th century?	4 Park Place, St James's	Enthusiasts for the revival of coaching	Closed
Royal Aero Club, formerly the Aero Club (1901–1909)	1901	119 Piccadilly (1901–1961); 9 Fitzmaurice Place (inside the Lansdowne Club, 1961–1968); 94 Pall Mall (inside the Junior Carlton Club, 1968–1970); 116 Pall Mall (inside the United Service Club, 1970–1977)	"the encouragement of aero-automobilism and ballooning as a sport"	Merged into the British Gliding Association in 1977 – no longer provides club facilities, although Office in Leicestershire.
Royal Anglo-Belgian Club	1942	6 Belgrave Square (1942–1978); 60 Knightsbridge (sharing premises of the Royal Thames Yacht Club, 1978–2010); 8 Northumberland Avenue (2010–2012)	Belgium, Luxembourg, Netherlands	Closed in 2012
Royal Societies Club	1894	63 St James's Street	Fellows and members of royal societies	Closed in 1941
South African & Rhodesian Officers Club	WW1 to 1920s	48 Grosvenor Sq	?	?
St James's Club (Crockford's) (1)	1823	50 St James's Street	?	Closed on 1 January 1846, late the Military, Naval and County Service Club, formerly the Military and County Service Club.
St James's Club (2)	1857	106 Piccadilly	Members of the British diplomatic service, and foreign diplomats in Britain	Closed in 1978, and membership merged with Brooks' .
St Stephen's Club	1870	Bridge Street, Westminster (19th century); 34 Queen Anne's Gate, near St James's Park (1962–2013)	Political; Conservative	Closed 31 December 2012
Sports Club	1893	8 St James's Square	Sports	Merged with the present East India Club in 1938
Thatched House Club	1865	85–86 St James's Street	Non-political	Built on the site of the Thatched House Tavern. The Civil Service Club, which occupied the building 1866–1870, may have been incorporated into the Thatched House Club, which moved to the Junior Carlton Club in 1949.
Union Club	1800	Trafalgar Square	Social	Moved in 1925 to 10 Carlton House Terrace, and again in 1949 to 85–86 St James's Street (formerly the Thatched House Club); merged with the United Service Club in the 1960s. Original clubhouse is now Canada House
Unionist Club	1886	66–68 Pall Mall	Political; Liberal Unionist	Closed in 1892; clubhouse acquired by the New Oxford and Cambridge Club
United Club	Late 19th century?	Charles Street, near Berkeley Square	Linked to the United Hotel, with additional facilities for members	Closed
United Empire Club	1904	101 Piccadilly	Global Reform;	Closed
United Service Club ("The Senior")	1815	116 Pall Mall	Senior officers (Major/Commander and above) in the army and navy	Closed in 1978; former clubhouse is now occupied by the Institute of Directors
United University Club	1821	1 Suffolk Street, near Pall Mall (1826–1971)	Graduates of Oxford and Cambridge	Merged with the present Oxford and Cambridge Club in 1971. Clubhouse is now the London centre of the University of Notre Dame
Watier's	?	81 Piccadilly	?	Closed
Wellington Club	Oct 1832	1 Grosvenor Place; 116a Knightsbridge (1932–2016)	Social	Closed 26 June 2016
West Indian Club	1898	Howard Hotel, Norfolk Street; 4 Whitehall Court;	Social	Closed March 1971
Windham Club	1828	106 Pall Mall (1828–1830, 1941–1946); 10 St James's Square (1830–1836); 13 St James's Square (1836–1941)	?	Merged with Marlborough and closed
The Wing	2019	14 Great Portland Street, Fitzrovia	Social	2020
York Club	Mid/late 19th century	8 St James's Square (1886–88)	?	Closed. Building later acquired by the Junior Travellers' Club, then the Sports Club.

=== Clubhouses of defunct clubs ===
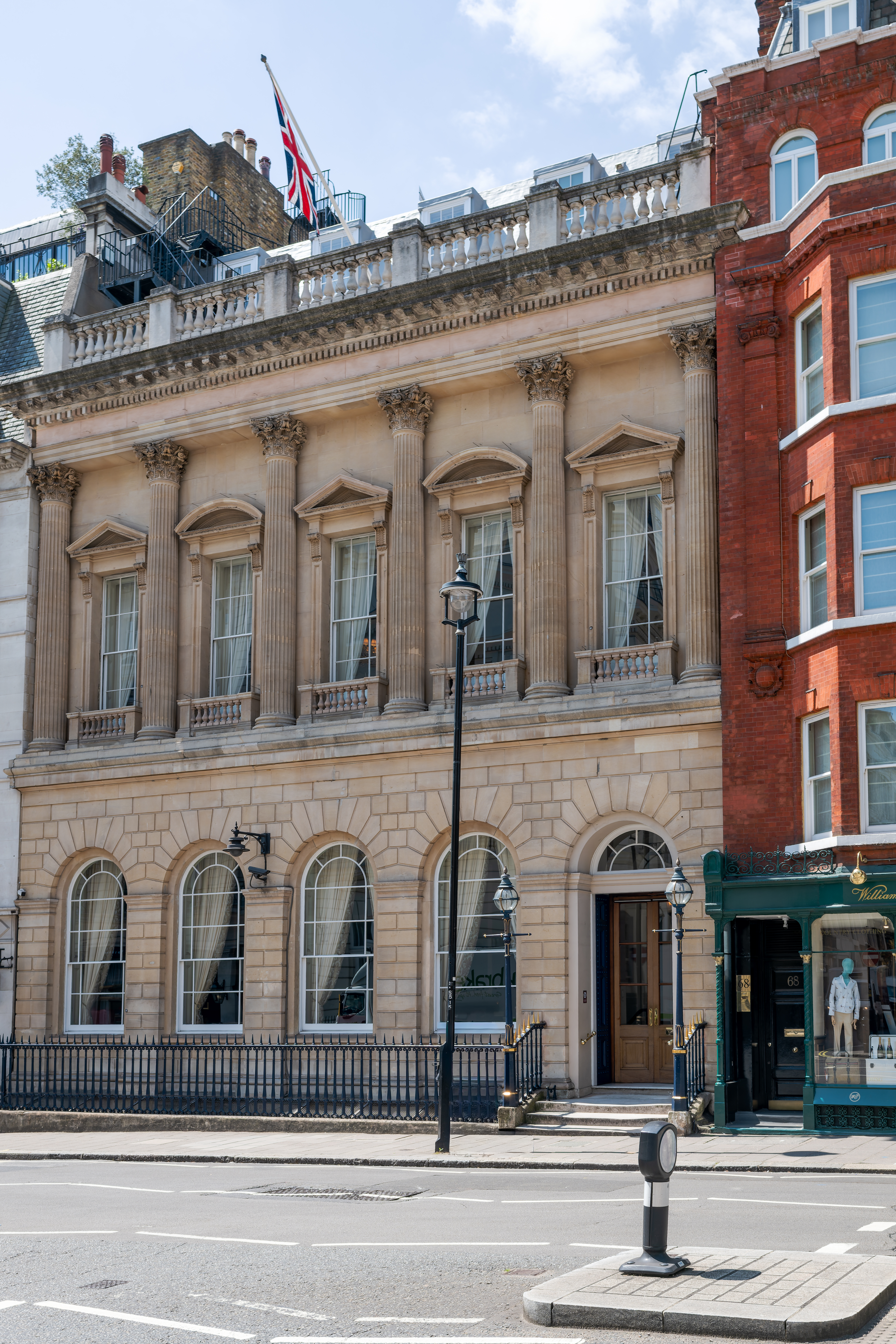
Arthur's

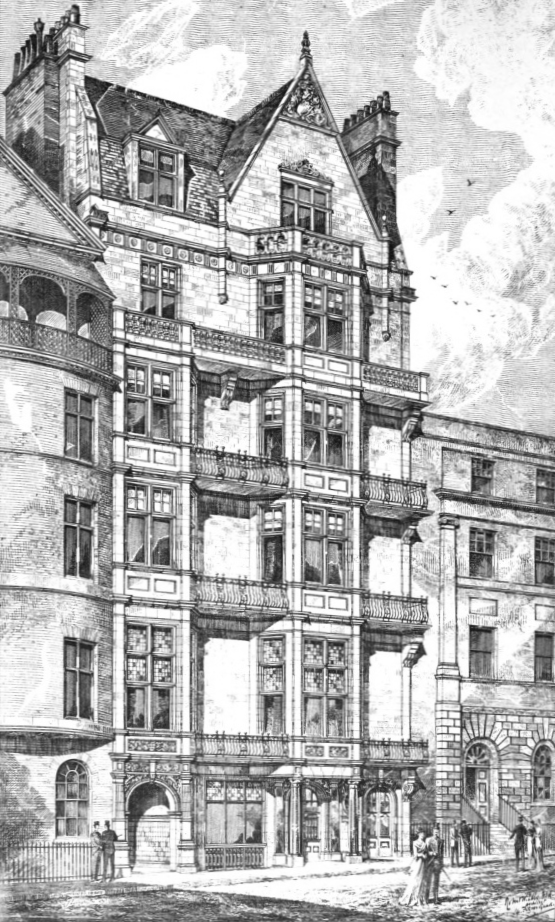
Badminton Club

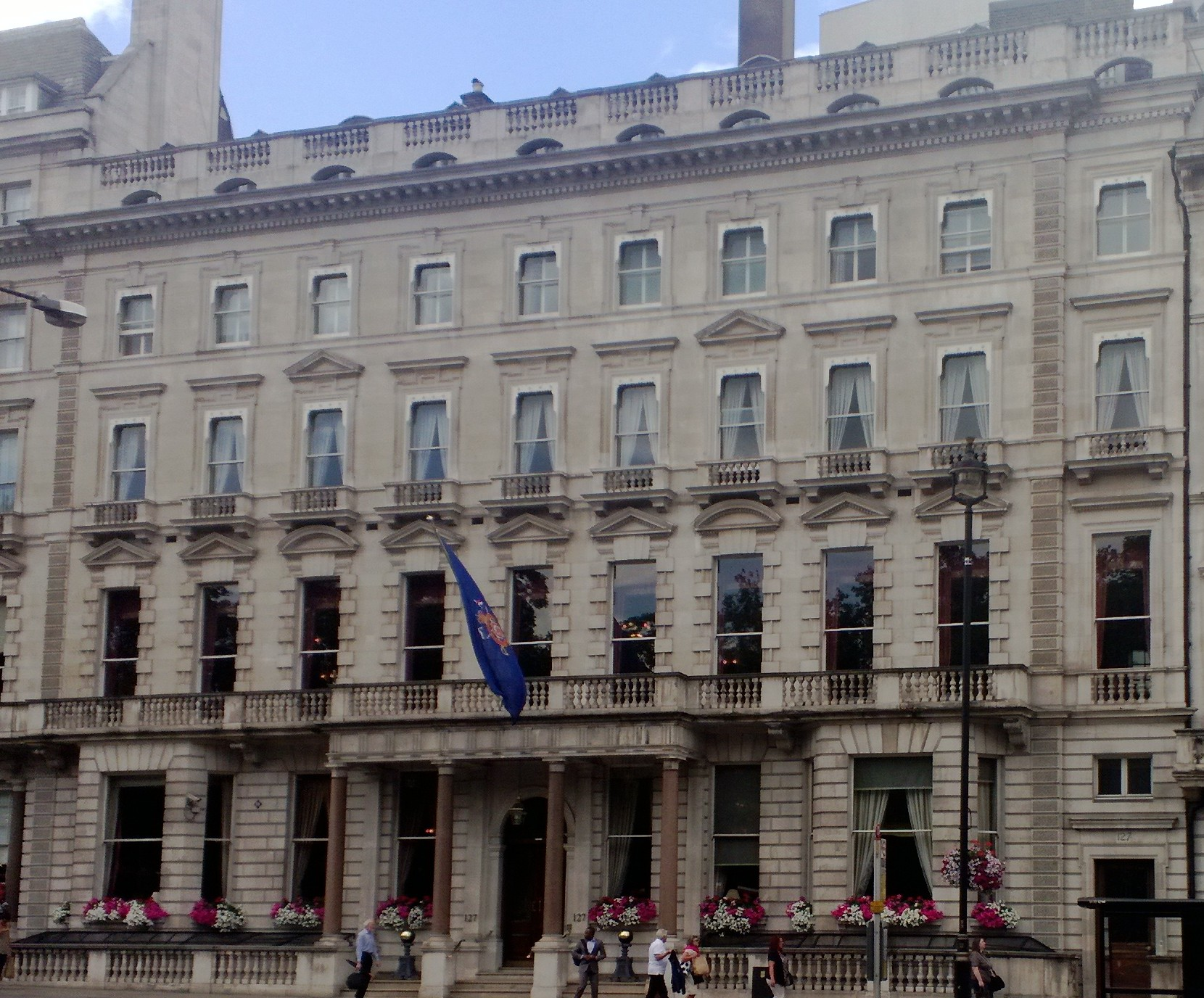
Cavalry Club

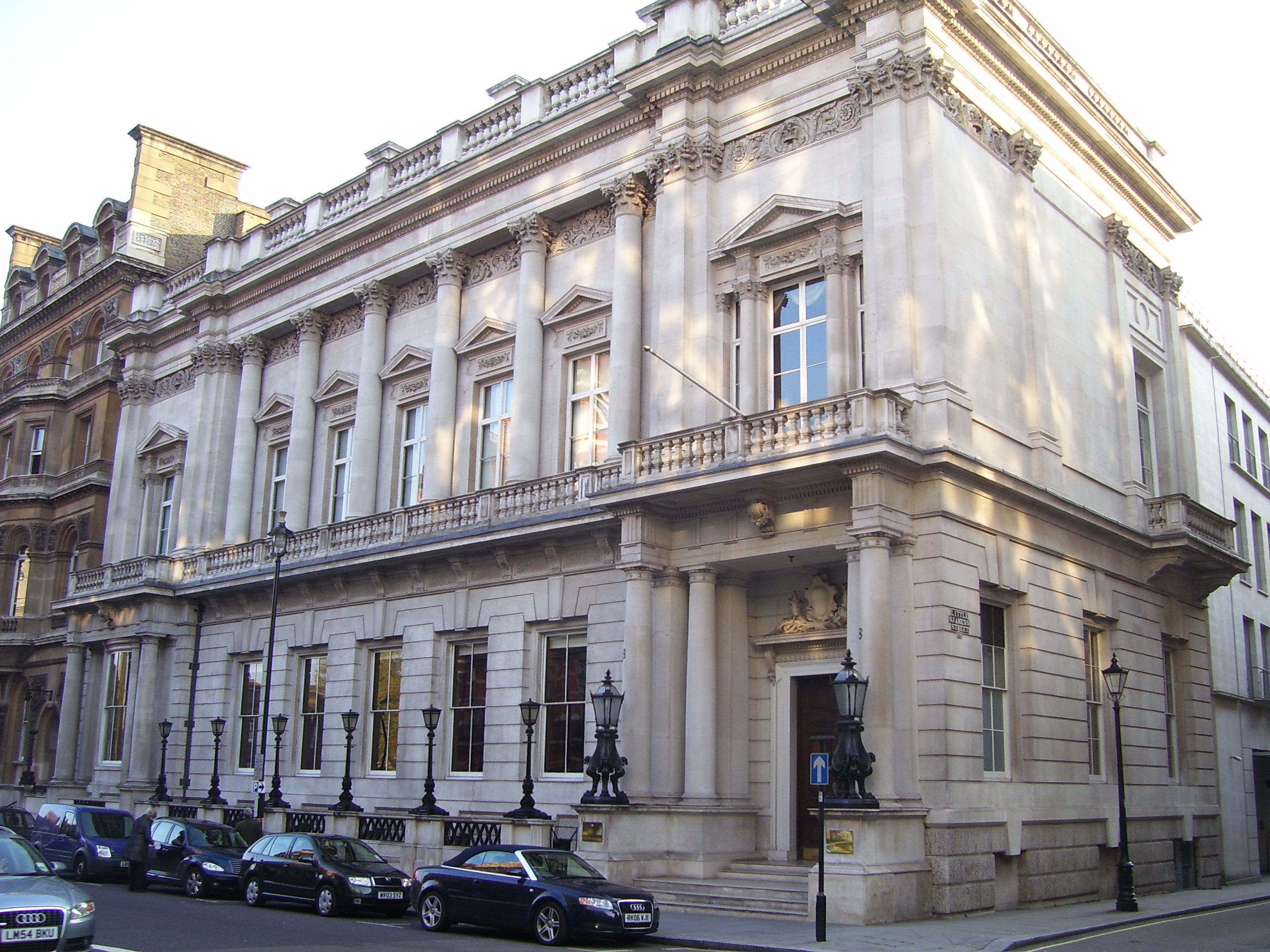
Conservative Club

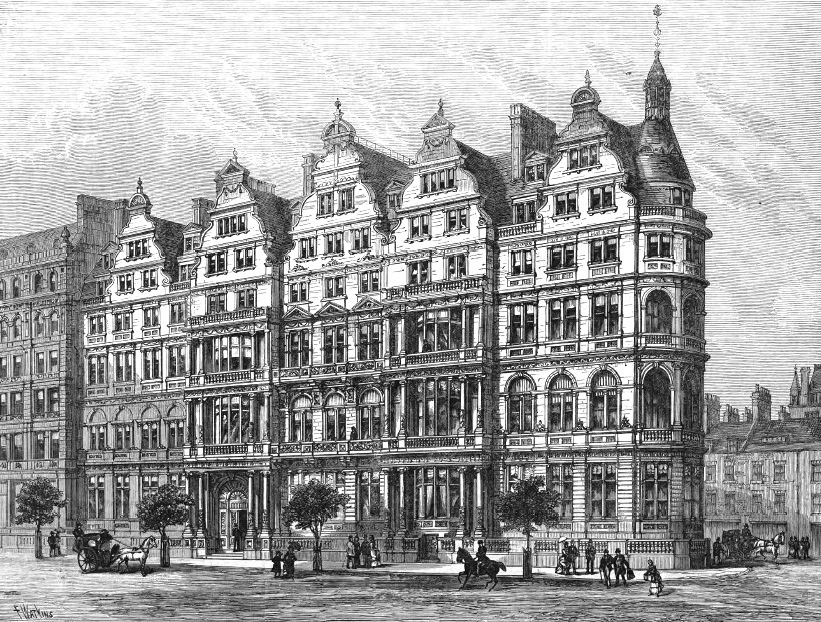
Constitutional Club (demolished)

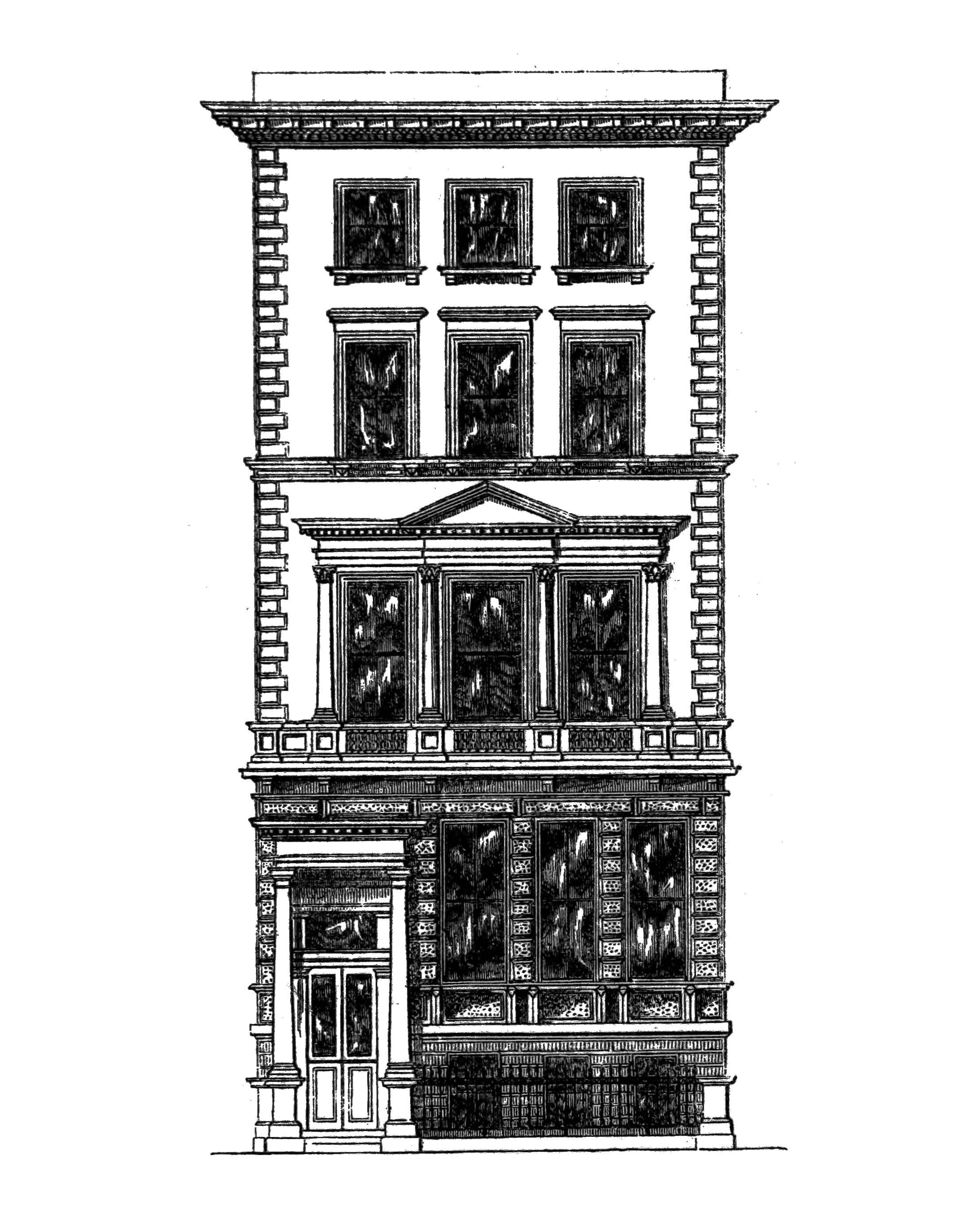
Guards Club (demolished)

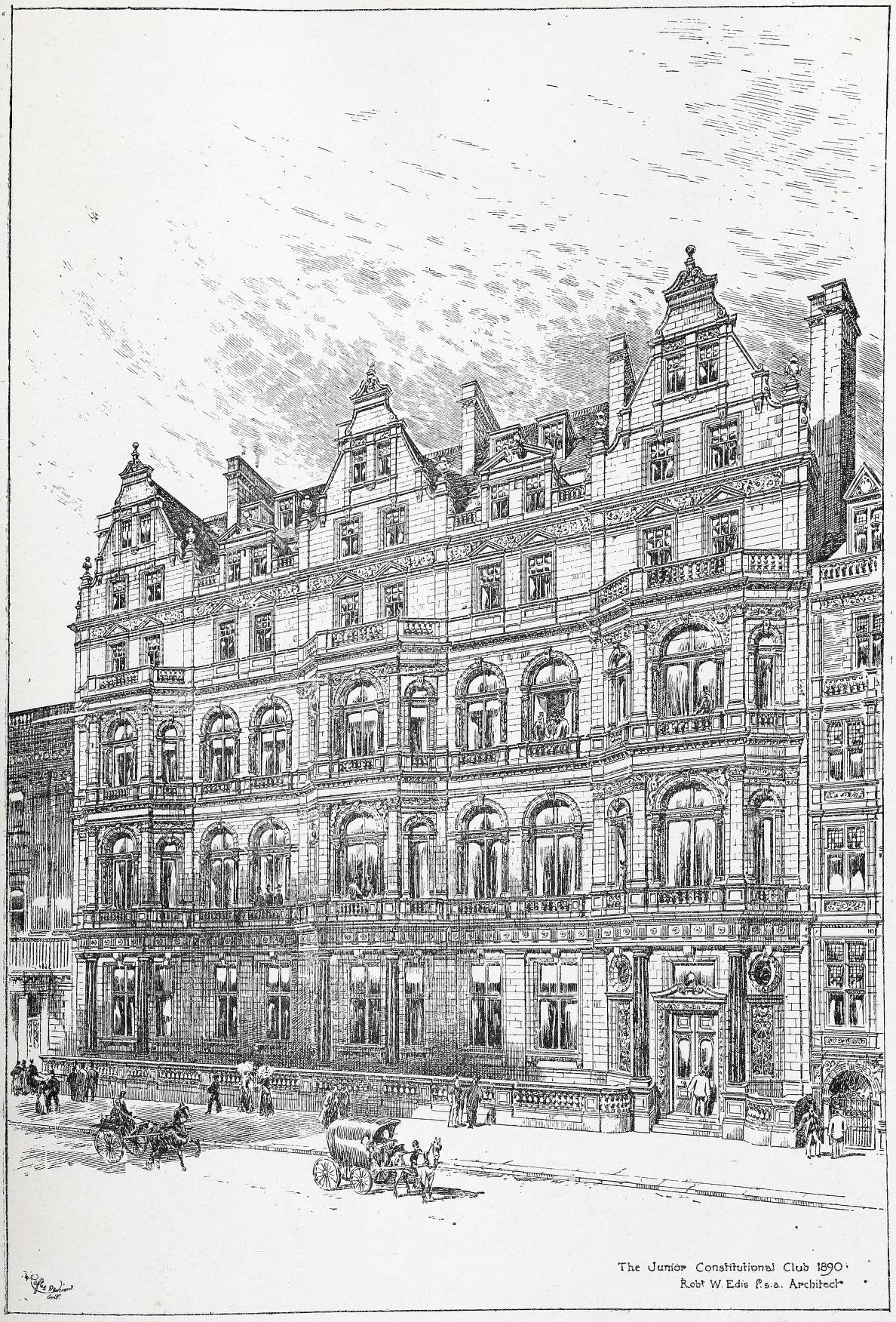
Junior Constitutional Club

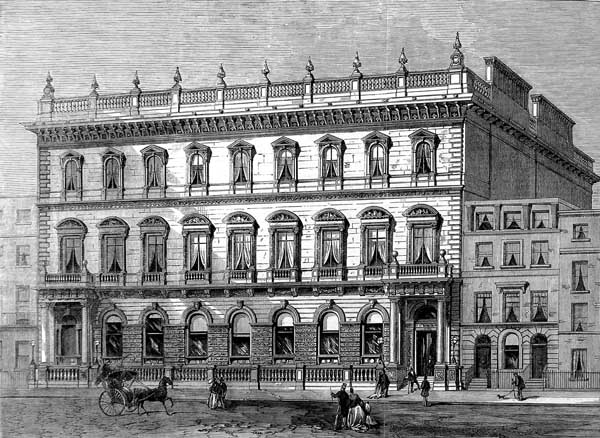
Junior Carlton Club (demolished)

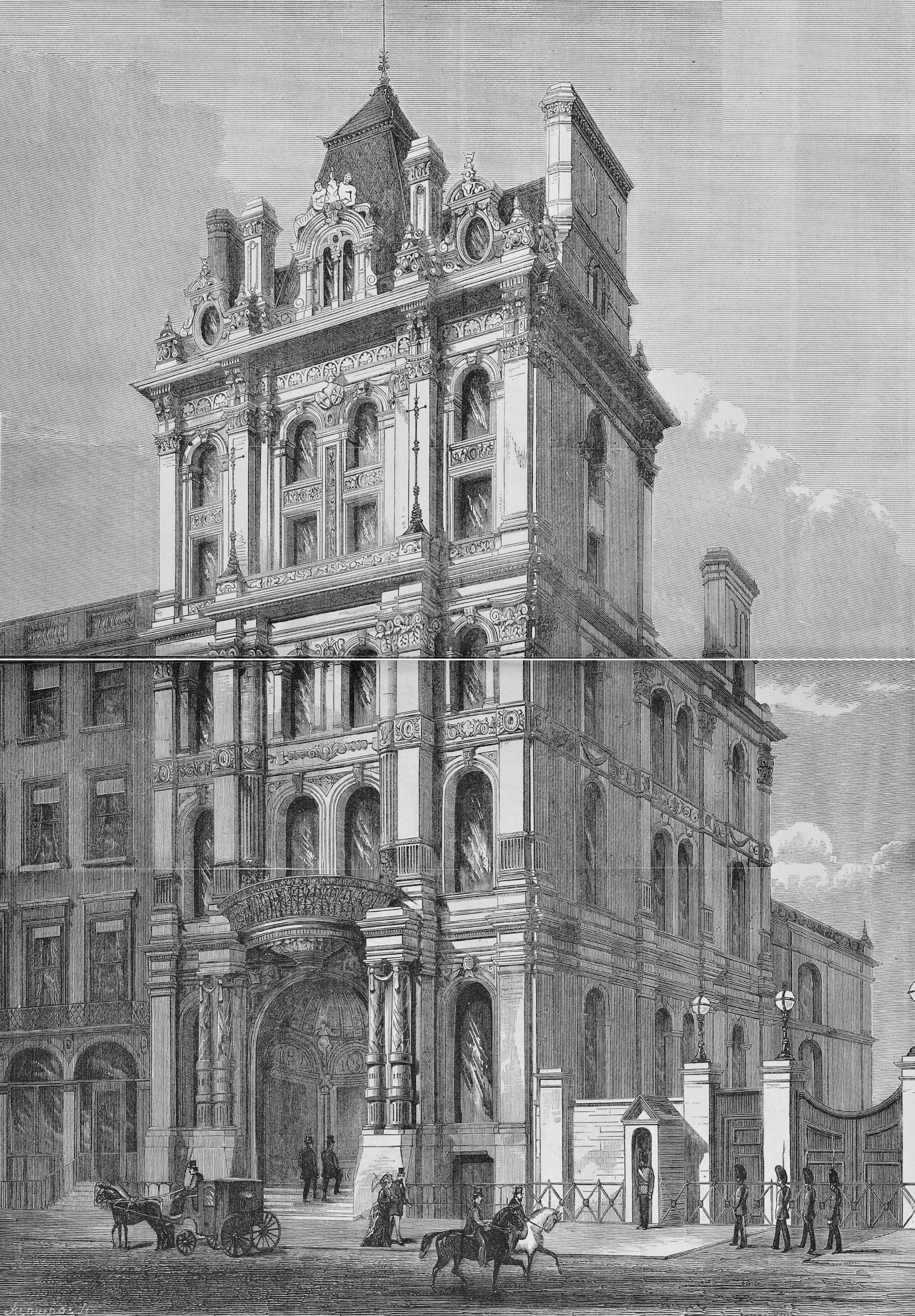
Junior Naval and Military Club (demolished)

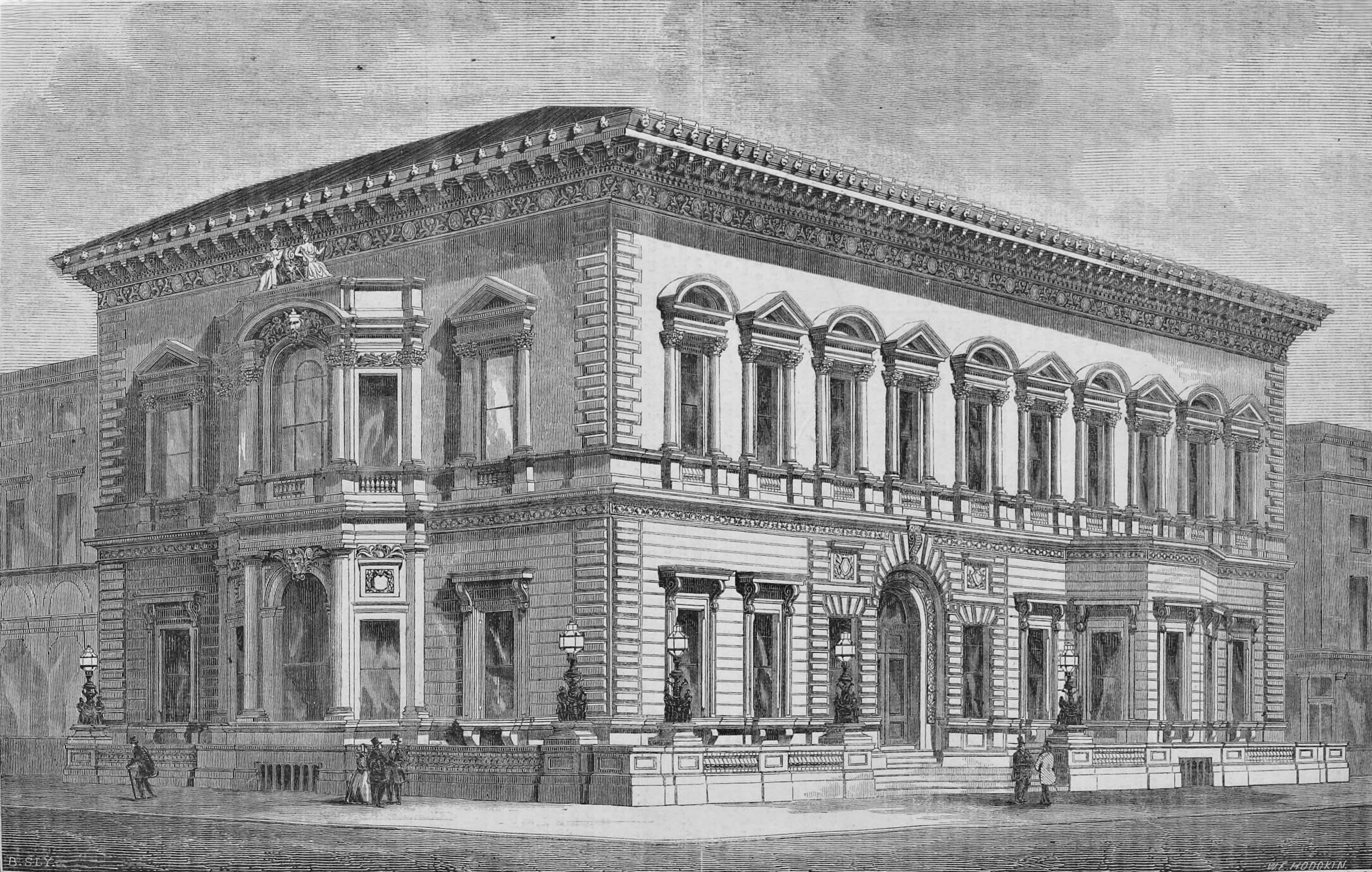
Junior United Service Club (demolished)

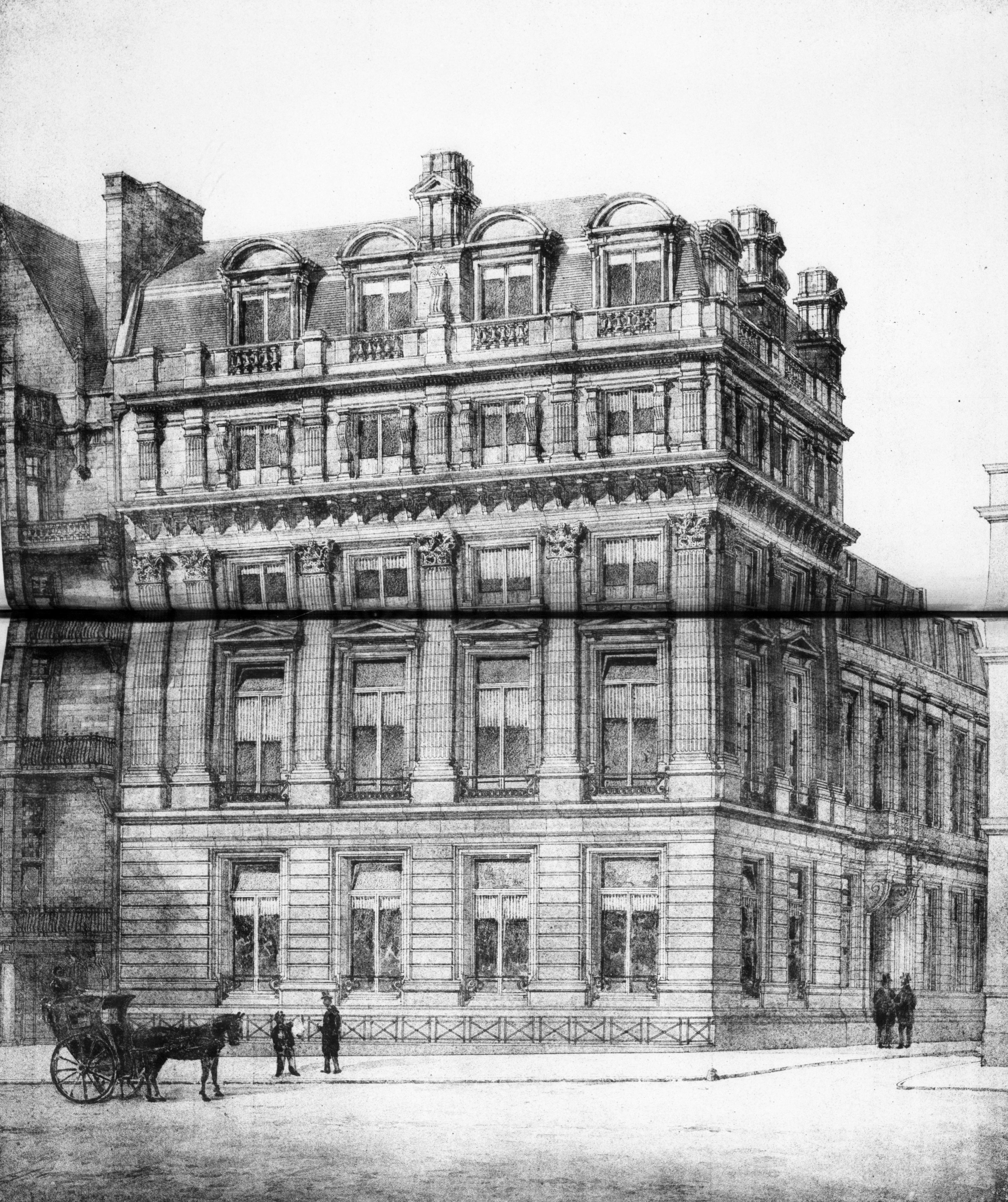
New Travellers Club

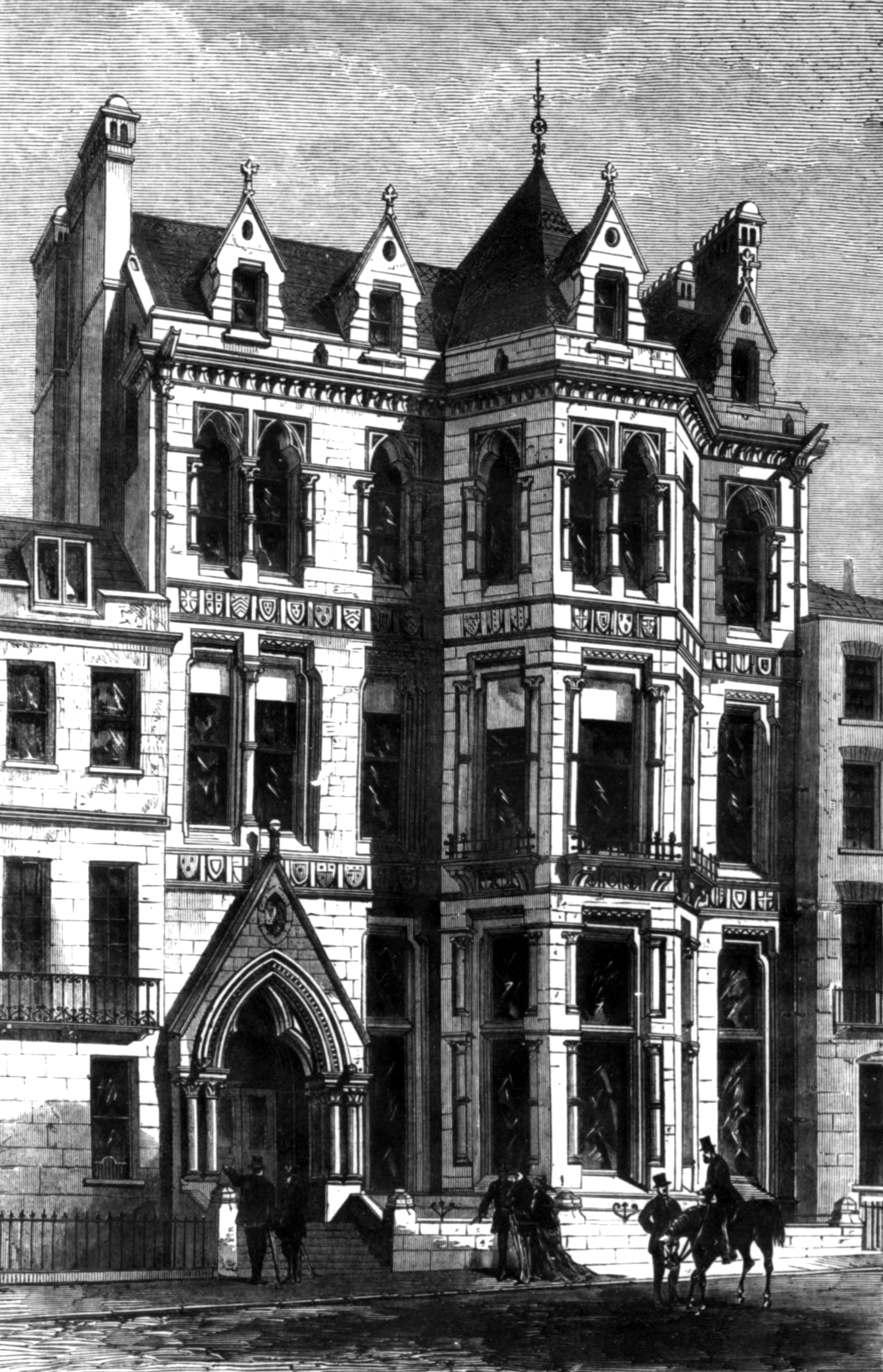
New University Club (demolished)

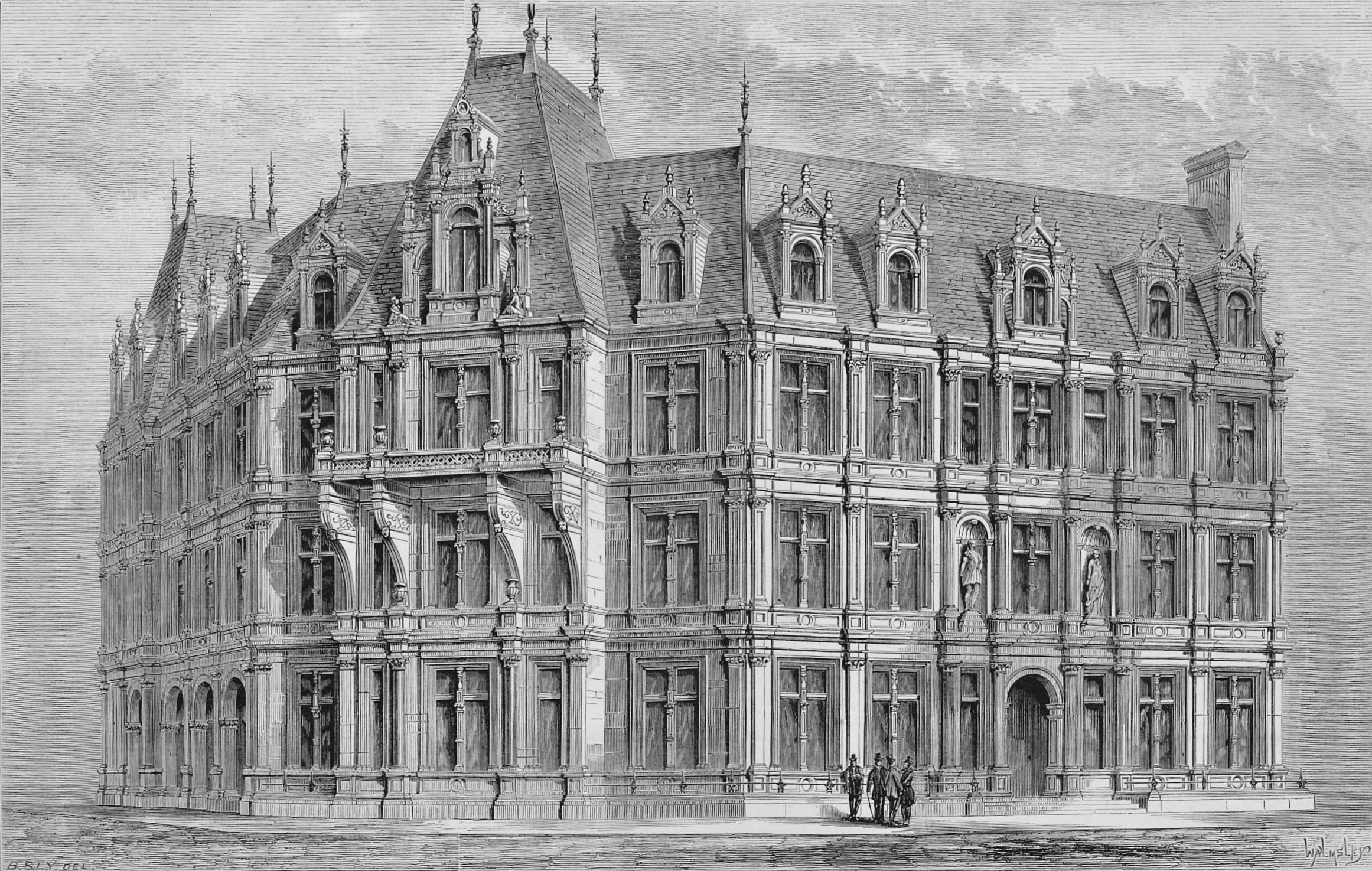
St Stephen's Club (demolished)

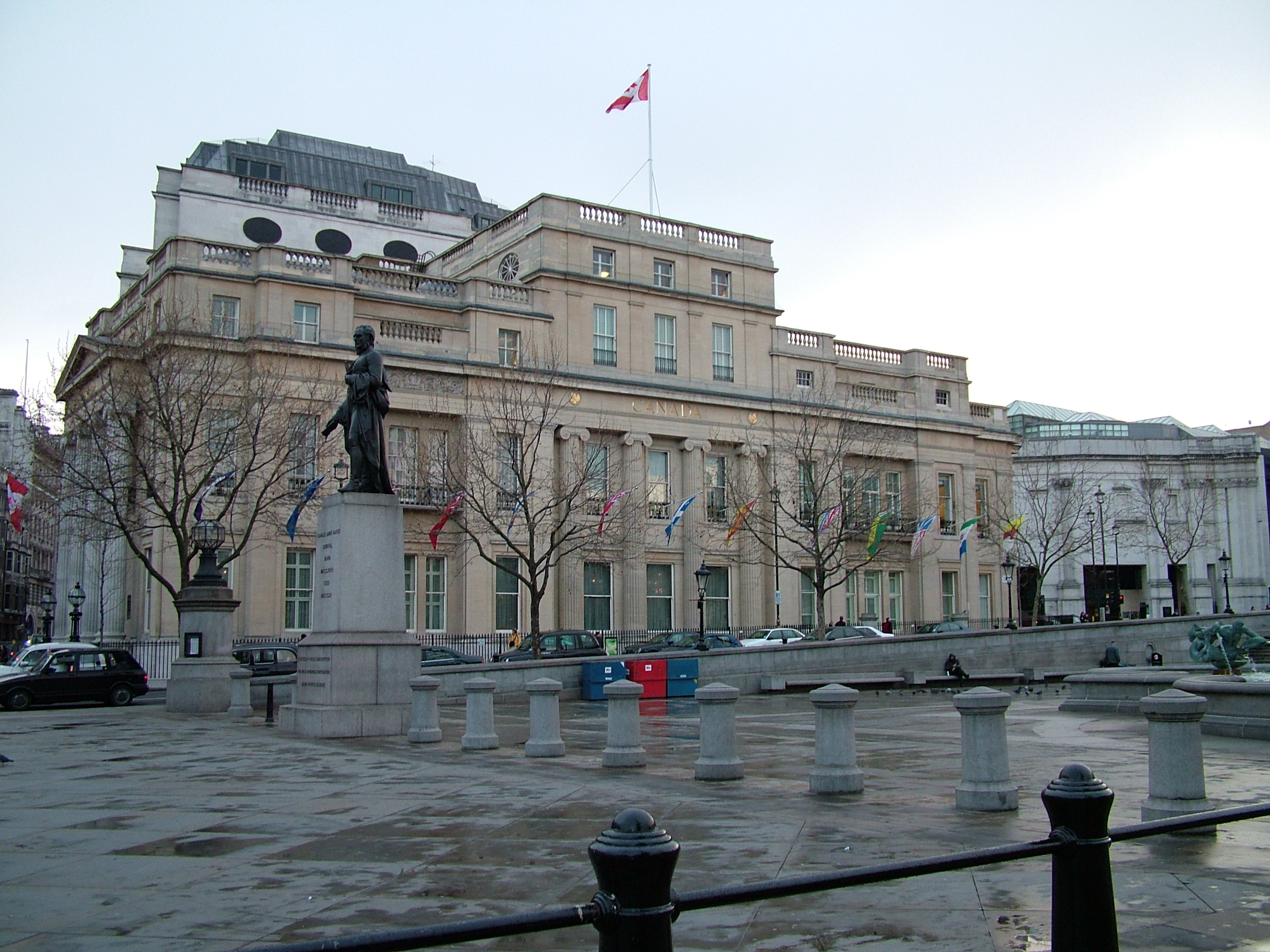
Union Club

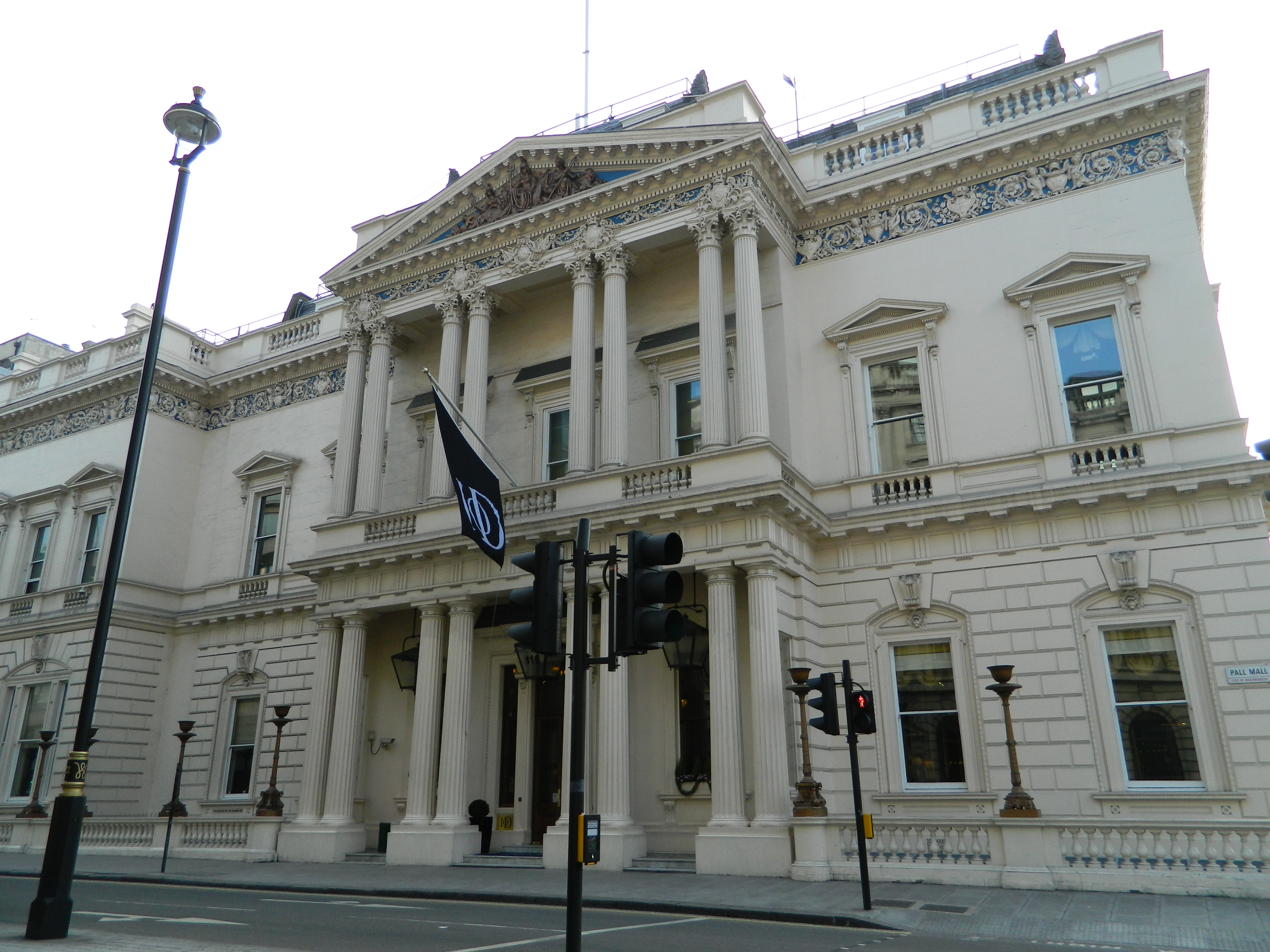
United Service Club

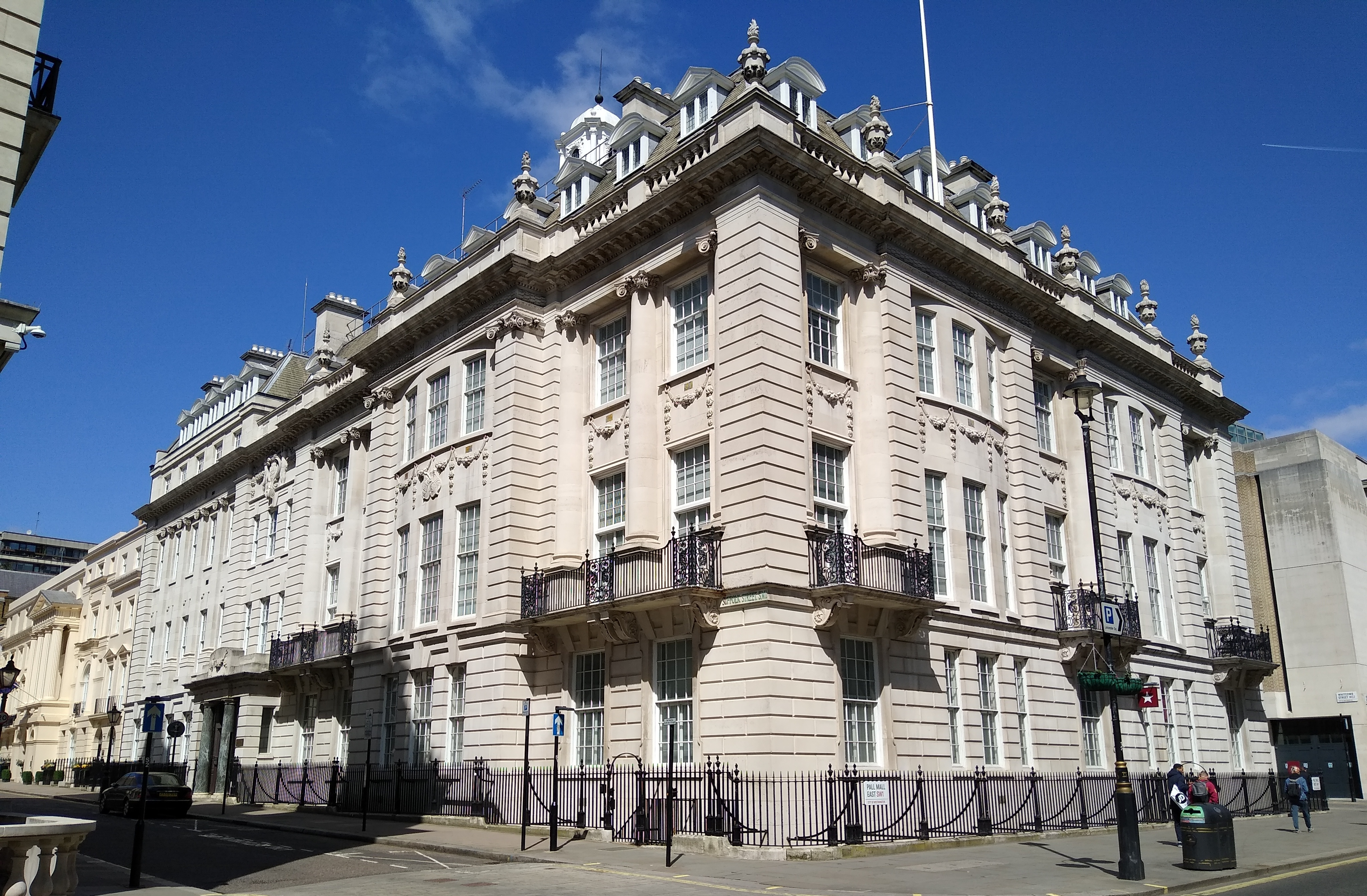
United University Club

== Fictional clubs ==
- Bagatelle Card Club – One of Colonel Sebastian Moran's clubs in the Sherlock Holmes story The Adventure of the Empty House by Sir Arthur Conan Doyle.
- Beargarden Club – A St James's club in Trollope's Palliser novels
- Bellamy's - Guy Crouchback's club in Evelyn Waugh's novel Officers and Gentlemen
- Bellona Club – Lord Peter Wimsey's club and location of a murder in Dorothy L. Sayers novel The Unpleasantness at the Bellona Club
- Billiards Club – Setting for the improbably tall tales of Jorkens, by Lord Dunsany
- Black's Club – Jack Aubrey's, Stephen Maturin's, and Sir Joseph Blaine's club in Patrick O'Brian's Aubrey-Maturin series of Napoleonic Wars series of seafaring novels. O'Brian also makes future monarch Prince William, Duke of Clarence a member.
- Blades Club – MI6 intelligence agency director M's club in the James Bond series of espionage novels by Ian Fleming.
- Bratt's Club – John Beaver's club in A Handful of Dust by Evelyn Waugh; Charles Ryder's club in “ Brideshead Revisited” by Evelyn Waugh; Colonel Charles Russell's club in two of the first three novels by William Haggard.
- Centaur Club – Francis Blake's club in Blake and Mortimer (comics) by Edgar P. Jacobs
- Craven's – A gaming club founded by the enigmatic Derek Craven, brought to life by author Lisa Kleypas, destroyed by fire in its prime.
- Diogenes Club – Mycroft Holmes's club in the Sherlock Holmes stories by Sir Arthur Conan Doyle.
- Drones Club – Bertie Wooster's club in P. G. Wodehouse's Jeeves stories; and is also the club of several other Wodehouse characters, including Bingo Little, Gussie Fink-Nottle, Psmith, and Freddie Threepwood.
- Etheric Explorers Club – a society featured in a series of short stories and novels by Paul Marlowe.
- Egotist's Club – Lord Peter Wimsey's club in the Dorothy L. Sayers novels and short stories.
- Ffeatherstonehaugh's Club – a corrupt and hedonistic establishment commemorating the libertine values of John Wilmot, 2nd Earl of Rochester, featured in the crime novel Clubbed to Death by Ruth Dudley Edwards.
- Hotch Potch Club – featured in John Galsworthy's The Forsyte Saga.
- Imperial Club – from the 1960s British television comedy series Bootsie and Snudge, starring Alfie Bass and Bill Fraser.
- Iseeum Club – another featured in John Galsworthy's The Forsyte Saga series of novels.
- Jenner's – a gaming club founded by the rough boxer Ivo Jenner, mentioned in the works of author Lisa Kleypas, later managed by the devilish Lord St. Vincent.
- Junior Ganymede Club – Jeeves's club (for gentlemen's gentlemen) in P G Wodehouse's Jeeves stories.
- Junior Greys, Pall Mall – one of Albert Campion's clubs in Margery Allingham's detective stories.
- Marine Commando Club, Paddington – frequented by Julian and Sandy from the BBC radio comedy Round the Horne. Note that Kenneth Horne's radio alter ego, a member of the Athenaeum, described it as "not my sort of club".
- Nimrod Club — Mr. Roby's club in Anthony Trollope's The Prime Minister
- Old Bohemian Club – "Bunny" and Raffles' club in E. W. Hornung's Raffles stories.
- Pickwick Club – A club founded by Mr. Samuel Pickwick to study human nature in Charles Dickens's first novel.
- Pelican Club – Sir Galahad's (Gally's) club in P.G. Wodehouse's A Pelican at Blandings
- Progress Club – a club that "...intended to do great things for Liberal Party . . . and had in truth done little or nothing." mentioned in the novel The Prime Minister by Anthony Trollope.
- Puffin's – one of Albert Campion's clubs in Margery Allingham's detective stories.
- Royal Bathers Club – club with Victorian Turkish baths of which Major-General Clive Wynne-Candy is a member in "The Life and Death of Colonel Blimp" (1943) by Michael Powell and Emeric Pressburger.
- Senior Conservative Club – features in P.G. Wodehouse's novel Psmith in the City. Although fictional, the description of a large, Conservative-aligned club in Northumberland Avenue tallies perfectly with the real-life Constitutional Club at No.28 and Nevill's Victorian Turkish Baths at No.25 Northumberland Avenue, "twenty yards from the club's front door" (which baths were also used by Sherlock Holmes and Raffles).
- The Seraphim Club – A private club featured in Gallows Thief by Bernard Cornwell.
- Stoics' Club – George Pendyce's club in The Country House by John Galsworthy.
- The Survivor's Club – featured in the novel The Somnambulist by Jonathan Barnes.
- The Tankerville Club – Featured in two Sherlock Holmes mystery detective stories by Sir Arthur Conan Doyle.
- Thackeray Club – club supposedly founded 1864 according to a bronze plaque by entrance door pictured in the musical comedy. dance movie Top Hat from 1935 starring Fred Astaire and Ginger Rogers along with Edward Everett Horton.
- Tweedles Club – club in the movie You Must be Joking 1965, American Films Limited, starring Terry Thomas, Michael Callan, Lionel Jefferies, Denholm Elliott, Wilfrid Hyde White and Bernard Cribbins.
- Whitehall Club – the setting of the murder mystery in the novel Keep It Quiet (1935) by Richard Hull.

== Gallery ==
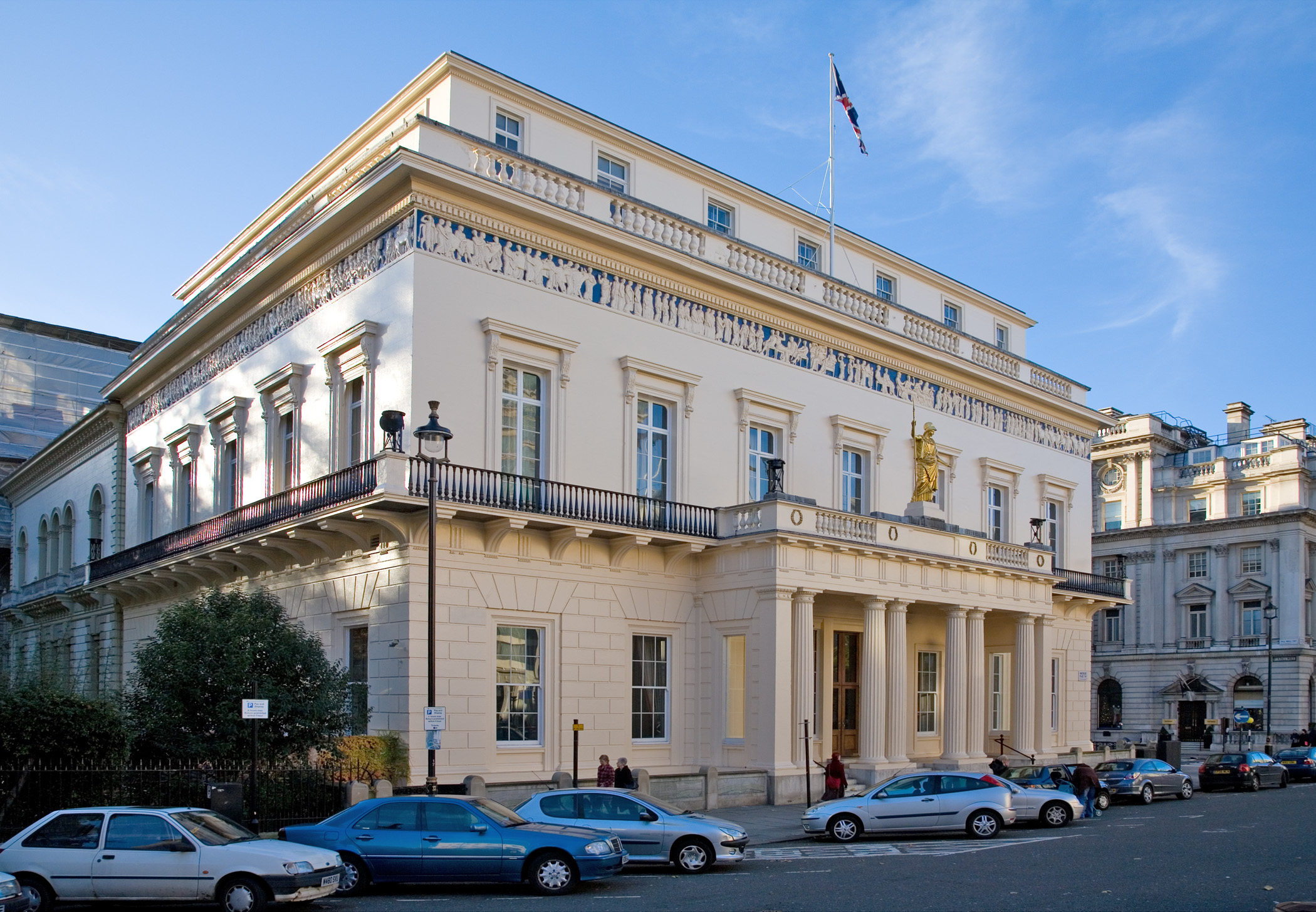
The Athenæum Club

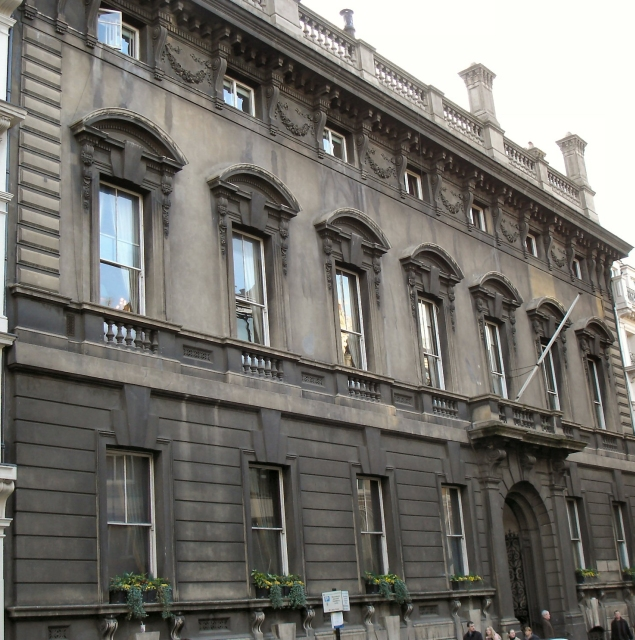
The Garrick Club

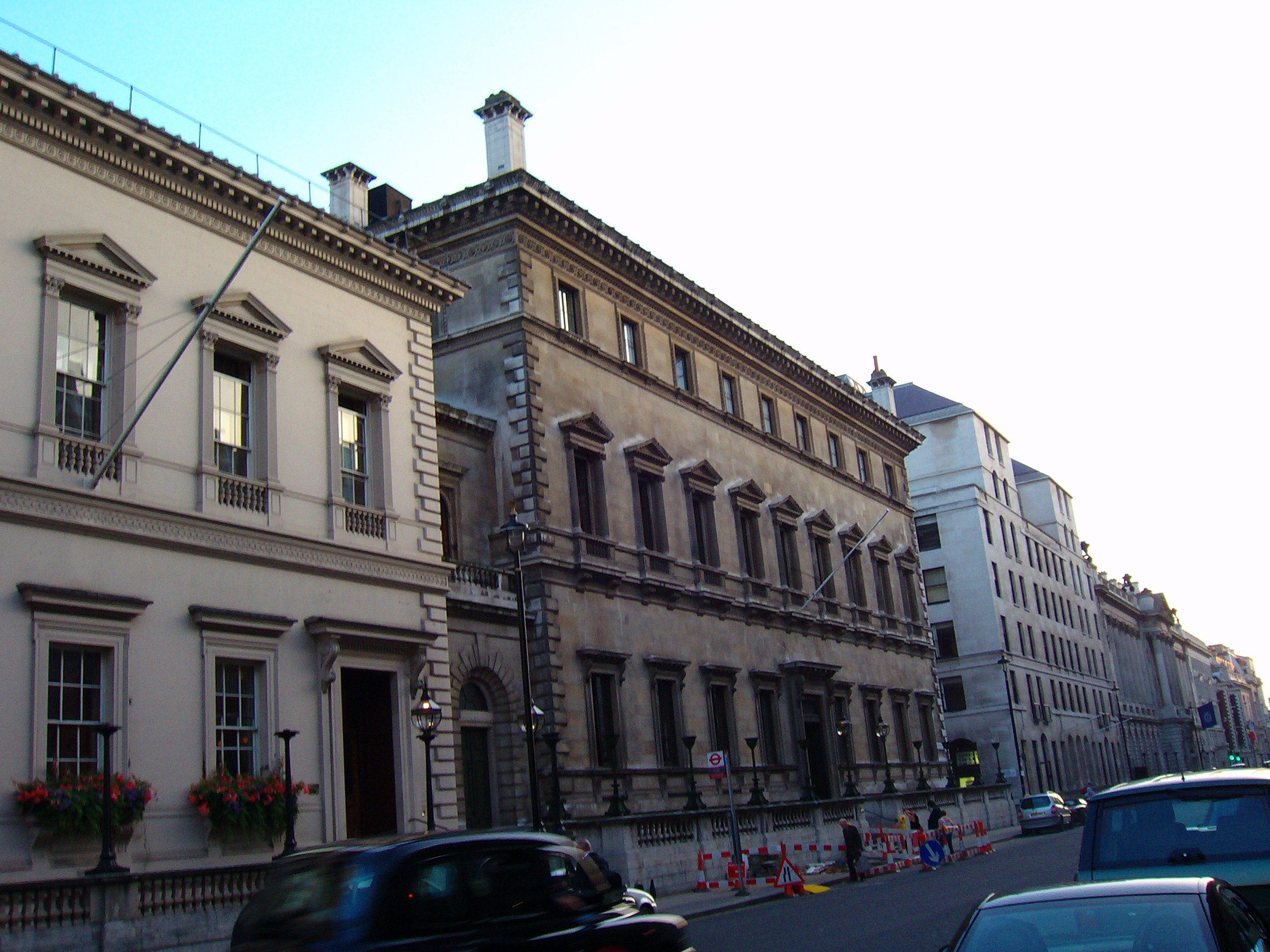
The Reform Club and the Travellers Club (Left)

== See also ==
- Country clubs
- Dining clubs
- List of American gentlemen's clubs
- List of India's gentlemen's clubs
