= Eighty Club =

Former London gentlemen's club

The Eighty Club was a political London gentlemen's club named after the year it was founded, 1880 (much like the later 1900 Club and 1920 Club). It was strictly aligned to the Liberal Party, with members having to pledge support to join. Somewhat dwarfed by mass-membership clubs like the National Liberal Club, it could only claim 400 members in 1890, and 600 by 1900.

H. H. Asquith was the first secretary of the Eighty Club and David Lloyd George was sometime President.

The Club closed in 1978, although the name was then adopted as the title of the Association of Liberal Democrat Lawyers' annual lecture series.

== See also ==
- List of London's gentlemen's clubs
