= Palace Club =

The Palace Club was a short-lived political London gentlemen's club founded in 1882. It was aligned to the Conservative party, with members having to pledge support. Unlike many of the better-established clubs like the Carlton, or some of the new clubs like the Constitutional, it never acquired a sizable membership; according to Whittakers Almanack it had only 220 members in 1890, and 250 by 1900. It closed within a decade.

== See also ==
- List of London's gentlemen's clubs
