= Canning Club =

Members' club in London, England

Coordinates: 51.5080°N 0.1348°W

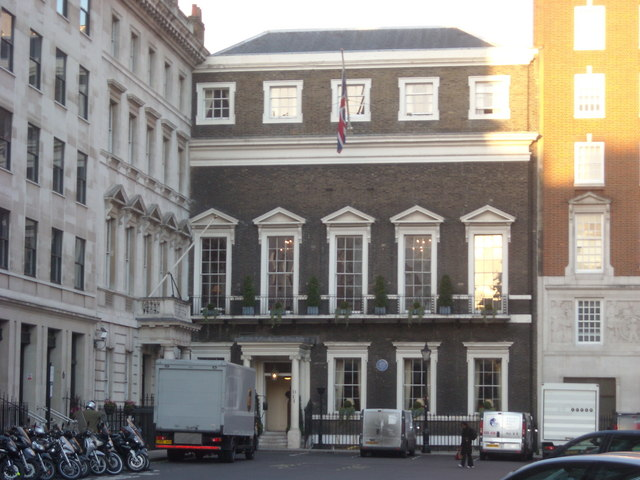
4 St James Square

The Canning Club is a gentlemen's club based in London, formerly named the Argentine Club, founded in 1911, and is for those with a particular link to, or special interest in, Argentina and other Latin American countries.

The club was originally established for nationals of Argentina, and much of its income was derived from Argentine-based British businesses. When these businesses were nationalised by Juan Domingo Perón from the 1940s, the club was deprived of its main source of revenue. Adapting to the situation, it redefined its remit more broadly to Latin America in general. In 1948, it was renamed as the Canning Club, in honour of George Canning, who had strong links to Latin America.

The club was based in Hamilton Place, Mayfair, until 1970, when it began sharing the premises of the Naval and Military Club, first at Cambridge House, 94 Piccadilly, and from 1999 at 4 St. James's Square.

== See also ==
- List of London's gentlemen's clubs
