= Naval Club =

Gentlemen's club in London, England

Coordinates: 51.508326°N 0.149537°W

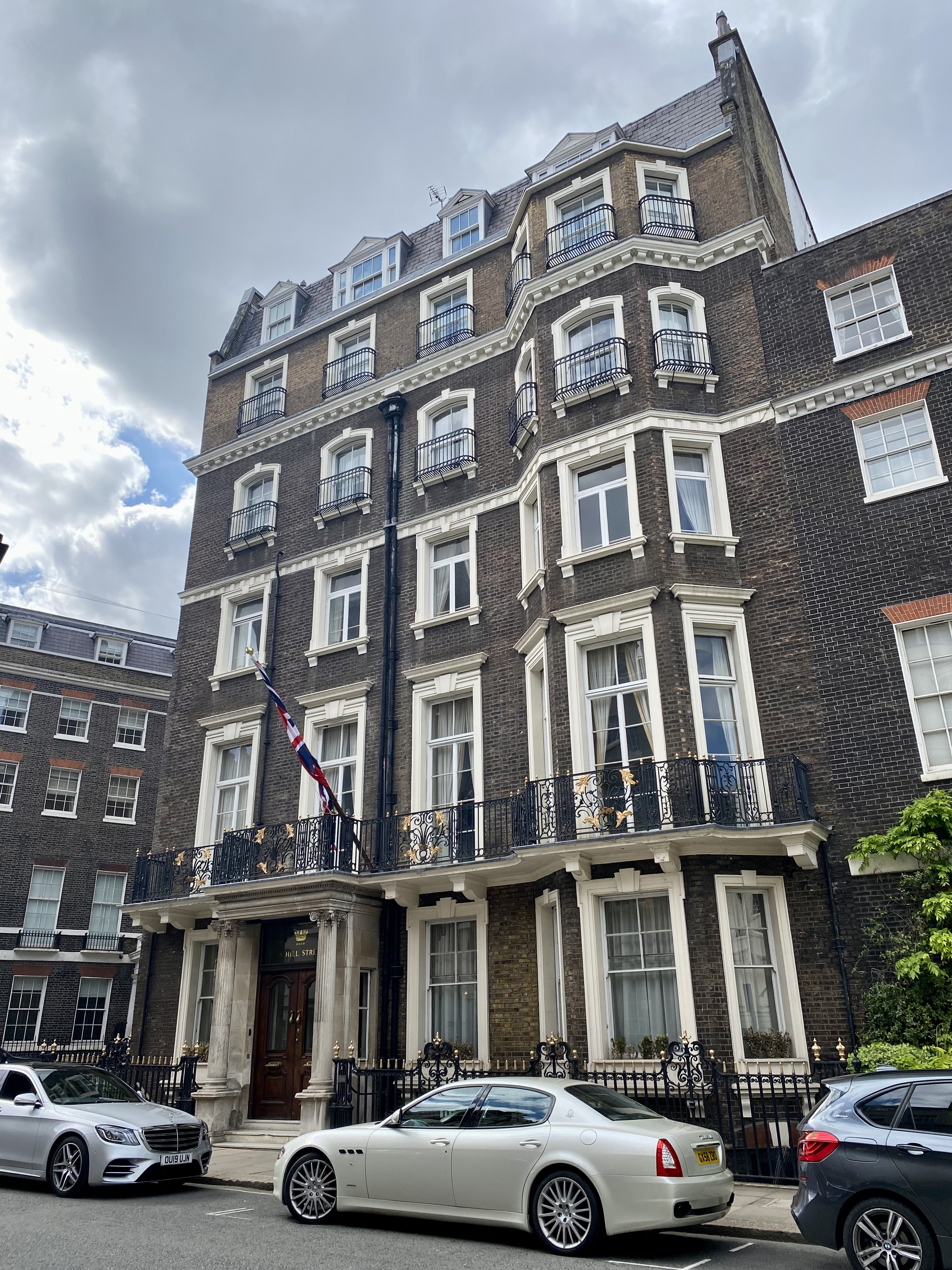
- 38 Hill Street, the site of the Naval Club between 1946-2020
- Formation: 1919 (Clubhouse occupied since 1946)
- Dissolved: 2021
- Type: Gentlemen's club
- Legal status: Permanently Closed
- Purpose: Club established for officers of the Royal Navy and RNVR
- Location: 38 Hill Street, London
- Website: navalclub.co.uk

The Naval Club, formerly the RNVR (Auxiliary Patrol) Club (1919–1943), and the RNVR Club (1943–1969) was a gentlemen's club in London established in 1919, which closed down in 2021 (having not survived closure during the COVID19 pandemic). From 1946 it owned the premises at 38 Hill Street, Mayfair which was formerly occupied by the 2nd Earl of Chatham, and the building was put up for sale in April 2021 for £35 million.

== History ==
It was founded as the RNVR (Auxiliary Volunteers) Club after World War I, for serving and retired officers of the Royal Naval Volunteer Reserve (RNVR). It leased interim premises from the Marlborough Club until 1946, when it acquired the Hill Street current townhouse with the financial assistance of the Astor family. The building also served as the headquarters of the RNVR Officers' Association.

In 1969, it changed its name to the Naval Club. The club's first president was Francis Curzon, 5th Earl Howe.

Notable members of the club have included Viscount Astor, Louis Mountbatten, 1st Earl Mountbatten of Burma, Alan Lennox-Boyd, and Harold Watkinson, 1st Viscount Watkinson.

Following its closure in 2021, former members were offered up to 5 years free membership of the Army & Navy Club in Pall Mall.

== See also ==
- List of London's gentlemen's clubs
