= Portland Club (London) =

London card-playing game club

Coordinates: 51.5063°N 0.1357°W

The Portland Club is a London card-playing game club and the recognised early authority on the games of whist and bridge. It is reputedly the oldest card club in the world. It was founded in October 1814 as the Stratford Club, 1, Stratford Place.

Following the bankruptcy of its bank, Marsh, Sibbald, and Co., in October 1824, the club had to change its partnership and was renamed the Portland Club in January 1825. Two newspapers reported the event: The Star of 5 November 1824 advertised: “In consequence of the failure of the Berners-street Banking-house, which possessed its funds, the Stratford Club, in Oxford-street, is about to be dissolved.” And, on 7 January 1825, The Morning Herald wrote: “It is the rump of the Old Stratford Club, we now hear, which assumes the imposing title of the Portland; and not, as we had been led to suppose, an entirely new Society.”

The Portland Club remained in its Stratford Place/Oxford Street premises until 1890. It then moved to 9, St James's Square, in a house that the club had bought there. However, in 1943 the Royal Institute of International Affairs bought the house from the Portland Club, which moved to Charles Street, an address which it left in 1969 for 42, Half Moon Street. From 1999 to 2014, the Portland Club was housed in the Savile Club, 69 Brook Street, then moved to its present premises. The club now meets in the Army and Navy Club at 36-39 Pall Mall, London SW1.

== See also ==
- List of London's gentlemen's clubs
