= Junior Athenaeum =

London gentlemen's club (1864–1930s)

Coordinates: 51°30′17″N 0°8′51″W

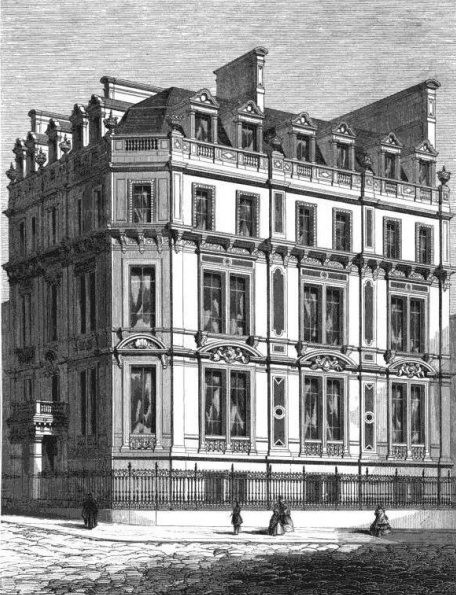
Mansion of Henry Thomas Hope, clubhouse of the Junior Athenaeum.

The Junior Athenaeum Club was a gentlemen's club in Piccadilly, London, from 1864 to the 1930s, with similar aims to the Athenaeum Club.

== Membership ==
Its membership was made up of members of both Houses of Parliament, members of the universities, fellows of the learned and scientific Societies, and gentlemen connected with literature, science, and art. Members were elected by ballot. The club's rules stated that “No ballot shall be valid unless at least twenty members actually vote. One black ball shall annul ten votes, a tie shall exclude.” The entrance fee was £31 10s., with an annual subscription of £10 10s. This is roughly equivalent to £3,400 and £1,100 in 2025, when adjusted for inflation.

== Clubhouse ==
The Junior Athenaeum bought Hope House from Henry Pelham-Clinton, 6th Duke of Newcastle in 1864. It had been built in 1849–1850 by Henry Thomas Hope, Newcastle's father-in-law. On its completion Charles Dickens remarked on its extravagant interior. Upon the club's dissolution, the building was bought and converted into a luxury Art Deco apartment block called The Athenaeum. In the 1970s the Rank Organisation incorporated the building into The Athenaeum Hotel.

== See also ==
- List of London's gentlemen's clubs
