= National Union (club) =

London gentlemen's club

The National Union was a short-lived political London gentlemen's club founded in 1887. It was aligned to the recently created Liberal Unionist party which had been created by the Home Rule issue. By 1890, it was reported by Whittakers Almanack to have around 1,200 members, but like the similar Unionist Club, it had difficulties establishing a membership base. Its history proved to be short, and it was disbanded before 1900.

== See also ==
- List of London's gentlemen's clubs
