= New Cavendish Club =

London private members' club

Coordinates: 51°30′57.49″N 0°9′36.34″W

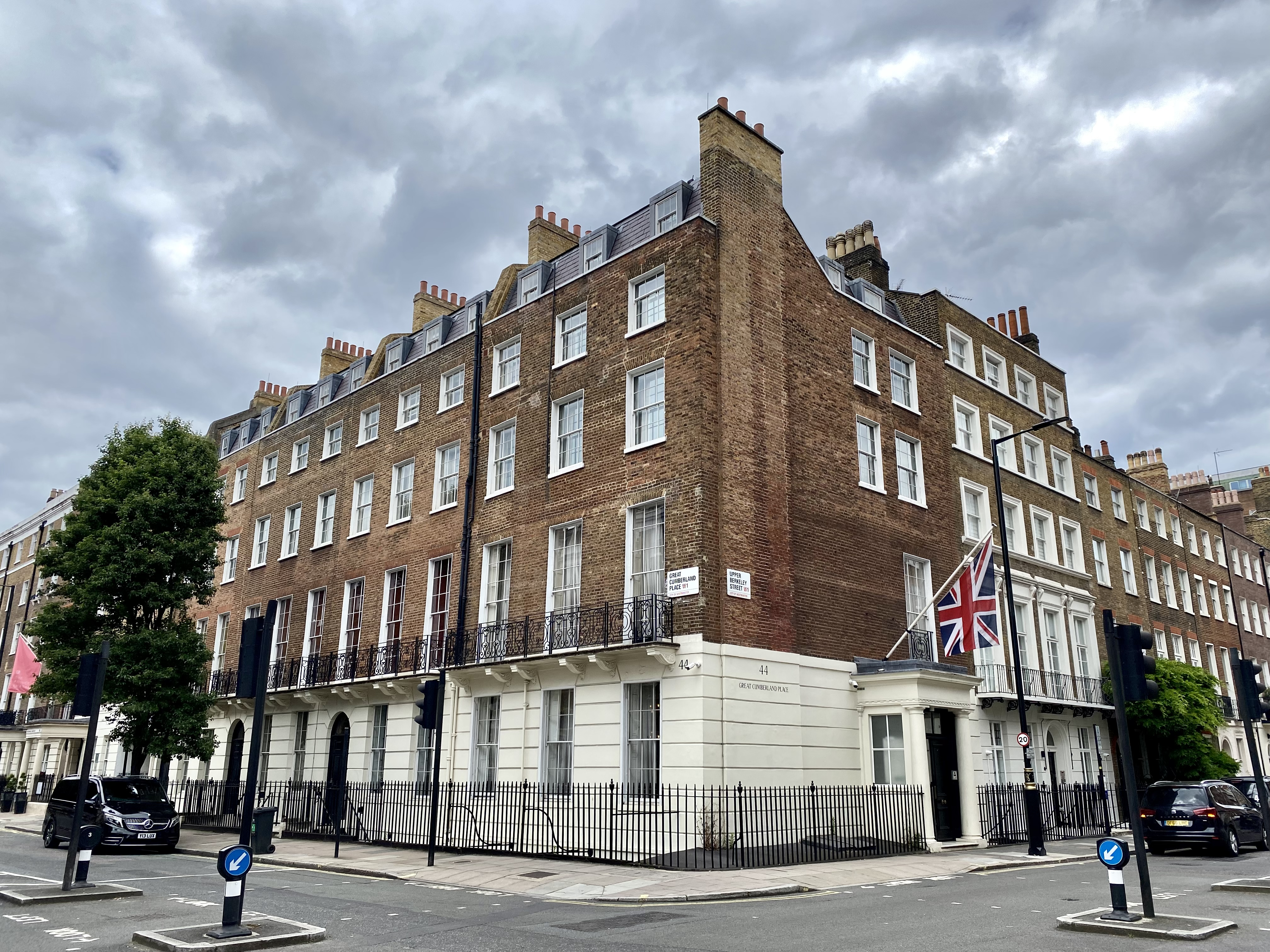
44-48 Great Cumberland Place, Marylebone. The home of the club from 1959

The New Cavendish Club was a London private members' club, run along the lines of a traditional gentlemen's club, although it had been founded as a Ladies-only club. It was located at 44-48 Great Cumberland Place in the Marylebone district.

== History ==
It was founded in 1920 by Margaret Russell, Lady Ampthill in her capacity as Chairman of the Voluntary Aid Detachment of nurses during World War I, and was intended to be "a first class Ladies' Club" for veteran nurses of the VAD.

The club opened with its inaugural dinner on 14 June 1920, with a 999-year lease acquired on premises at Queen Anne House, 28 Cavendish Square. The building was formerly Marshall Thomson's Hotel, which is described in William Makepeace Thackeray's Vanity Fair . The club's dining room was originally staffed by VAD veterans from the war. The Cavendish Square building was damaged by a fire bomb during the Blitz.

In 1957, the club sold its clubhouse, and moved in 1959 to its new premises in Great Cumberland Place, which required extensive modernisation - bomb damage from the war meant that the interior had to be almost entirely rebuilt from scratch. Between vacating the old building in September 1958 and moving to the new one in December 1959, the club's members were welcomed at several other London clubs on a temporary basis.

After the move, membership was then offered to members of the defunct Cowdray Club and Guide Club, as well as women of the Magistrates Association and the Women's Voluntary Service. Men were also finally admitted.

The club closed in 2014 and, after period of negotiation, the remaining members were invited to join the Naval and Military Club. The Clubhouse was sold to Home House private members' club and is being re-launched as "Home Grown" - a private members' business club.

== Notable members ==
- Margaret Russell, Lady Ampthill (founder)
- Queen Mary (patron)
- Princess Mary (honorary member)

== See also ==
- List of London's gentlemen's clubs
