= Badminton Club =

London gentlemen's club

Coordinates: 51°30′20.01″N 0°8′44.03″W

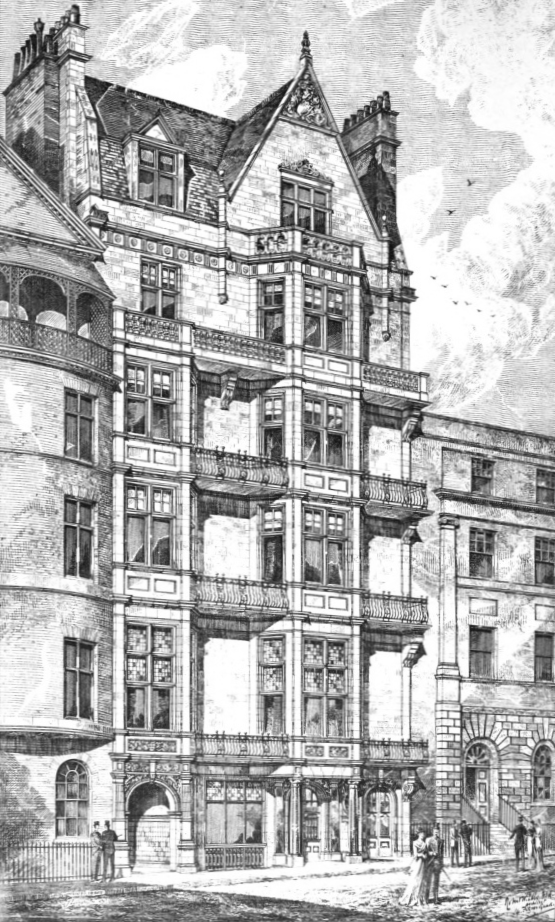
1884 drawing of the clubhouse at 100 Piccadilly, designed by Robert William Edis

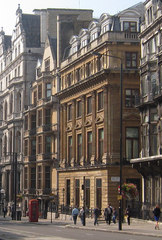
100 Piccadilly in 2009

The Badminton Club was a gentlemen's club in London. According to the 8th Duke of Beaufort in his book Driving (1901), the club was founded in 1875 at 100 Piccadilly by a sporting doctor named Mr. Hurman", or spelled Mr. Herman per Baily's (1879). According to the Duke, "this was a thorough coaching establishment, having all the year round a coach, a break, a team or two, besides [other carriages], as well as capital stabling and coach-houses, with chambers and bedrooms kept for the use of its members".

The club was named after Badminton House, the country seat of the Dukes of Beaufort. The 10th Duke was Master of the Horse (1936–1978) to three British monarchs, King Edward VIII, King George VI, and Queen Elizabeth II. Since 1949, Badminton House has hosted the prestigious annual Badminton Horse Trials, a three-day equestrian competition.

In 1883, the club also acquired the adjacent premises at 98 and 99 Piccadilly and a new clubhouse was built on the site, designed by the architect Robert William Edis. The principal internal feature was the "Flower Court", approached through the narrow entrance from Piccadilly.

The club flourished so long as the horse remained supreme in London but, by the late 1930s, driving was only the pastime of a few. The club had lost its raison d’etre and decided to disband in 1938. At about that time the Public Schools Club was on the lookout for larger premises and they took over the clubhouse immediately.

The clubhouse was finally closed in 1972, when the Public Schools Club merged with the East India Club in St James's Square, and was demolished a few years later. The last surviving parts of the clubhouse are the war memorial plaques for members of the Public Schools Club from World War I and World War II and the Badminton Club's plaque for World War I, which are still preserved at the East India Club.

== See also ==
- List of London's gentlemen's clubs
