= Military, Naval and County Service Club =

British gentlemen's club

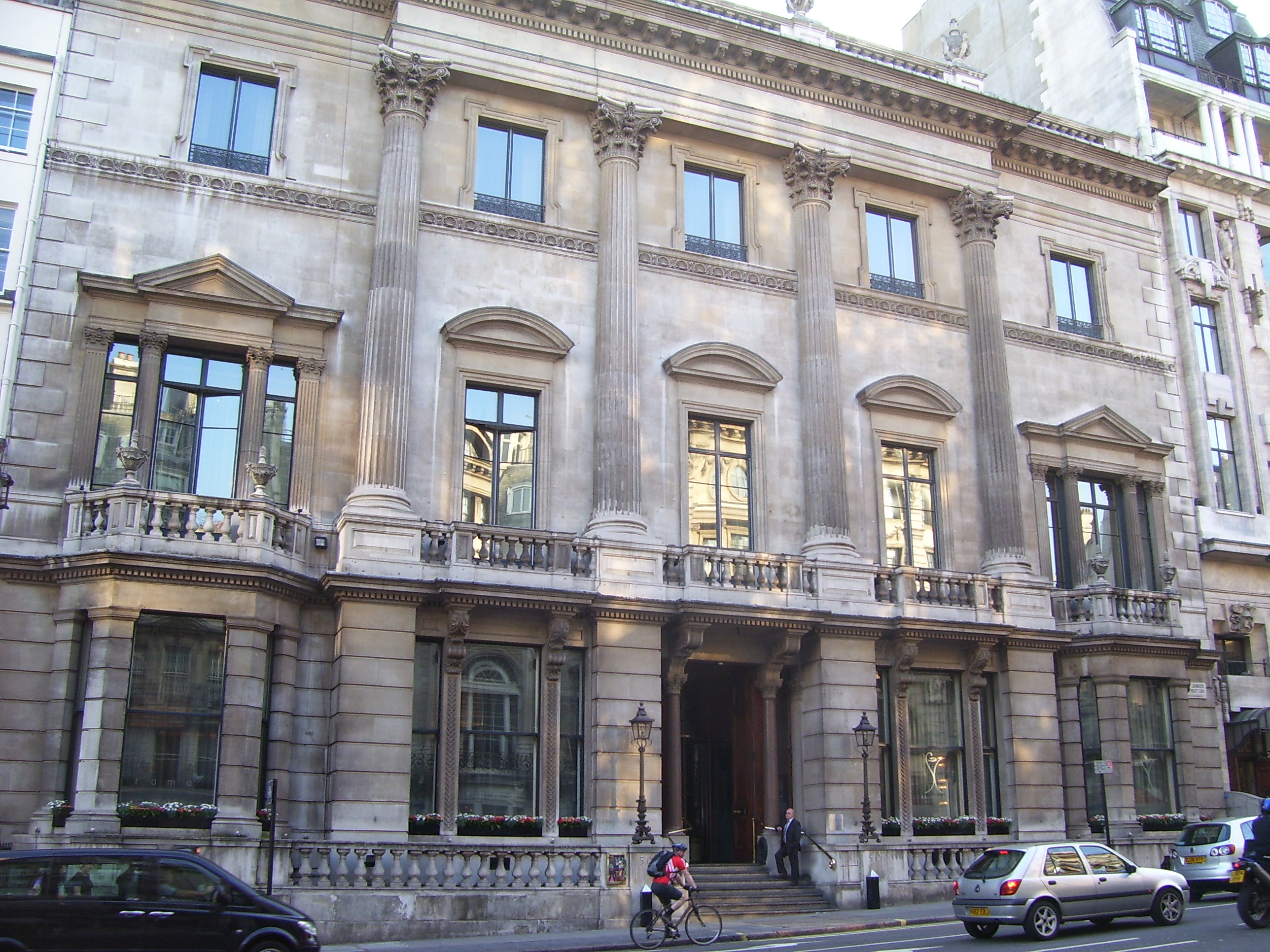
50 St. James's Street

The Military, Naval and County Service Club was a London gentlemen's club, which was established in November 1848 and dissolved on 15 July 1851. The club's motto was "Cor Unum Via Una". Its original name was the Military & County Service Club and not long before it closed it was renamed as the Saint James's Club.

The club occupied premises at 50 St James's Street. These premises had previously been used by William Crockford's St James's Club, which had closed on 1 January 1846. Afterwards they were used by the Wellington Dining Rooms, the St George's Club and between 1874 and 1976 by the Devonshire Club.

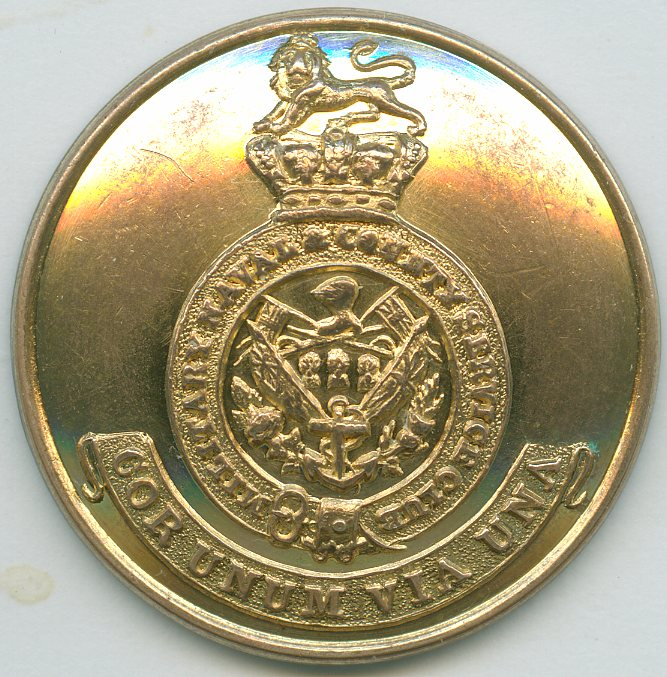
Servant's uniform button

== See also ==
- List of London's gentlemen's clubs
