= American Club, London =

London gentlemen's club

Coordinates: 51°30′20.72″N 0°8′42.27″W

The American Club was a London gentlemen's club, now dissolved. It was established to provide a centre for London's growing expatriate American community, with the inaugural meeting being held at the Savoy Hotel on 21 October 1918.

Shortly afterwards, it moved to its permanent home at 95 Piccadilly, next door to the Naval and Military Club (“In and Out Club”) at 94 Piccadilly, which was convenient, as many of the members knew each other from service in the First World War. It was a gentlemen's club, with an associated female branch, the American Women's Club (AWC) - requests made by the AWC to amalgamate were declined. Anthony Lejeune noted in the 1970s that "the disappointing thing, to an English visitor, about the American Club is that it contains so little which is specifically American", citing its similarity to many other London clubs.

The Club enjoyed the benefit of a long lease at a fixed rental dating back to the 1920s, due to wartime connections. When this expired in the 1980s the modern rent proposed effectively forced closure. As with many London clubs, membership had been in decline for some years. The premises then remained untenanted for many years.

== See also ==
- List of London's gentlemen's clubs
- List of American gentlemen's clubs
