= Anglo-Belgian Society =

The Anglo-Belgian Society is an organisation whose purpose is "to maintain and develop on a personal level the friendship which has always existed between the British and Belgian people and to commemorate the brotherhood in arms which arose from their mutual loyalty to the treaty of 1839". It was founded in 1983, incorporating the Anglo-Belgian Union (A-BU) (founded 1918) and Cercle Royal Belge de Londres (founded 1922). Its members include Belgians living in Britain, and British people and companies with an interest in Belgium. As of 2009 it has nearly 500 members.
