= Ian Posgate =

English insurance underwriter

Ian Posgate

Ian Richard Posgate (31 March 1932 – 7 July 2017) was an English insurance underwriter at Lloyd's of London, who was one of the highest earners in Britain in the 1970s, but who was later banned from the market.
