= 1920 Club =

London gentlemen's club

Coordinates: 51.5055°N 0.1244°W

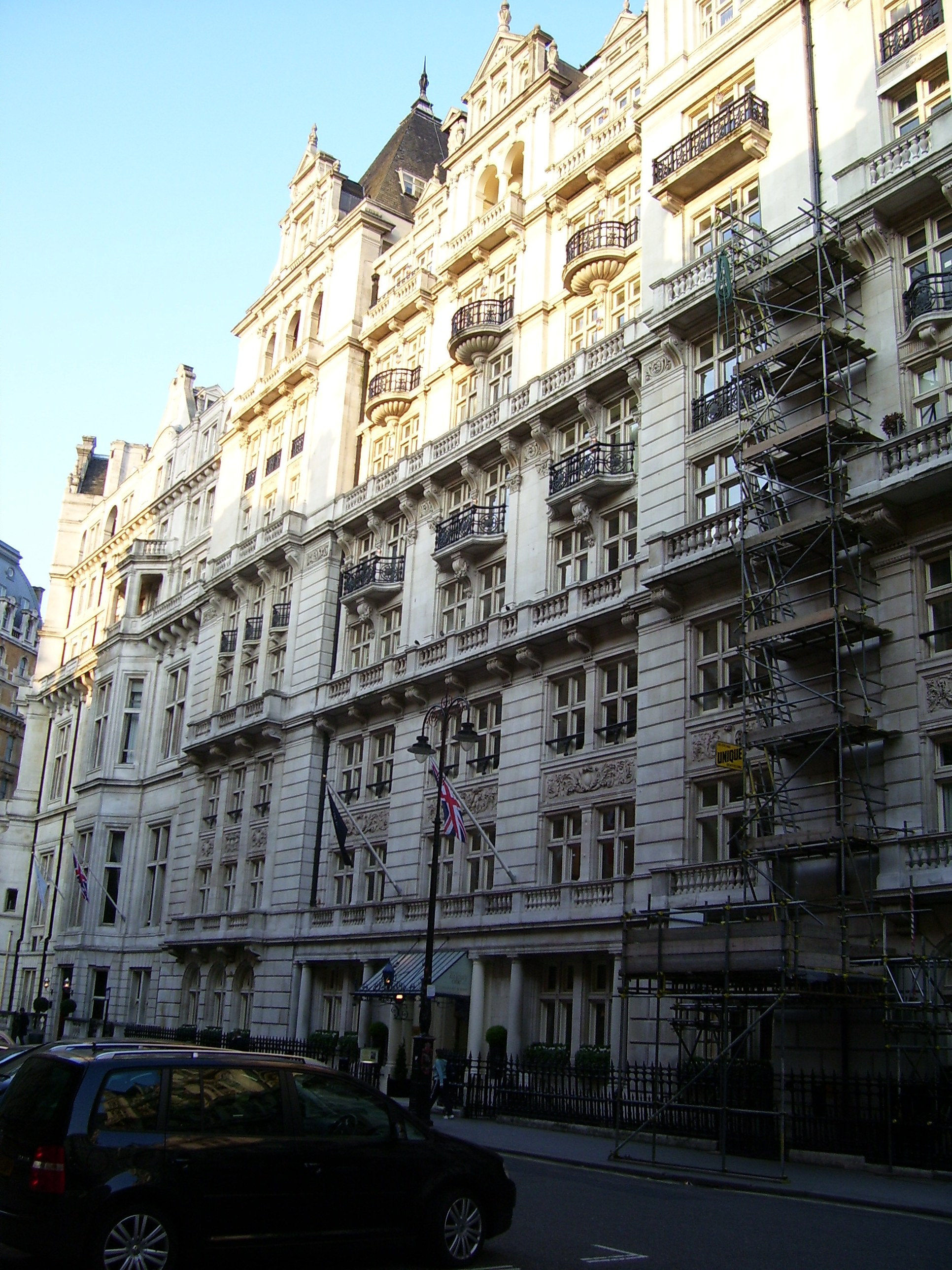
The Whitehall Place entrance to the short-lived 1920 Club

The 1920 Club was a short-lived London ladies and gentlemen's club, which existed in the 1920s.

The original London club was established for Liberal supporters of the Lloyd George government, after the National Liberal Club began systematically blackballing Lloyd George's supporters. This was symptomatic of a deeper schism at the time, between the 'official' Liberal Party in opposition, led by H. H. Asquith (which retained control of the party machinery), and those led by Lloyd George in a coalition with the Conservatives. The club opened in December 1920, in rooms at 2 Whitehall Court (inside what is now the Royal Horseguards Hotel), neighbouring the National Liberal Club – something the 1920 Club's committee described as 'a coincidence'.

It evolved from being just a club for coalition supporting Liberals. It was a relatively unusual club, in that it admitted both men and women as full members. This resulted in a number of prominent Liberal Party women, such as Margery Corbett Ashby joining.

== See also ==
- List of gentlemen's clubs in London
