= Constitutional Club =

Gentlemen's club in London, England

Coordinates: 51°30′24.81″N 0°7′31.84″W

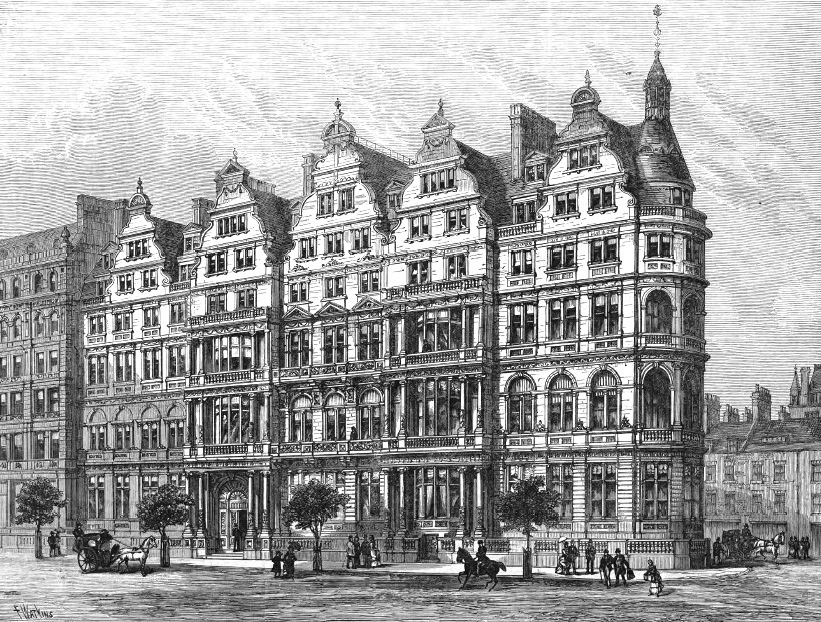
The Constitutional's clubhouse.

The Constitutional Club was a London gentlemen's club, now dissolved, which was established in 1883 and disbanded in 1979. Between 1886 and 1959 it had a distinctive red and yellow Victorian terracotta building, designed by Robert William Edis, at 28 Northumberland Avenue, now part of the Grand Building off Trafalgar Square.

== Politics ==
The club was closely aligned to the Conservative party, with members having to pledge support. The club was founded in anticipation of imminent franchise reform then being debated in parliament, which was eventually realised as the Representation of the People Act 1884. It was anticipated that as many more Conservative supporters would be given the vote, many would want to belong to a Conservative club. Existing Conservative clubs like the Carlton and the Junior Carlton feared that they would become inundated with membership applications from the new voters, so the Constitutional Club was founded with these new electors in mind. (The National Liberal Club, just around the corner from the Constitutional Club, was founded in 1882 with the same purpose in mind for the Liberal party, as the existing Liberal clubs, the Reform and the Devonshire, had been similarly oversubscribed.)

== Membership ==
The Constitutional Club's membership was originally limited to 6,500.

Despite being avowedly non-political, P.G. Wodehouse was a member of the Constitutional Club, and was reputed to have considered it his favourite London club. Seven of his stories describe a fictitious Senior Conservative Club in Northumberland Avenue, with a similar décor to the Constitutional, and which also features a Victorian Turkish bath, just like the one found next door to the Constitutional. These books are Psmith in the City, Something Fresh, Leave it to Psmith (where the club is said to have 6,111 members), Pig-hoo-o-o-o-ey, Full Moon, A Tithe for Charity, and Pearls, Girls and Monty Bodkin (which establishes its Northumberland Avenue address).

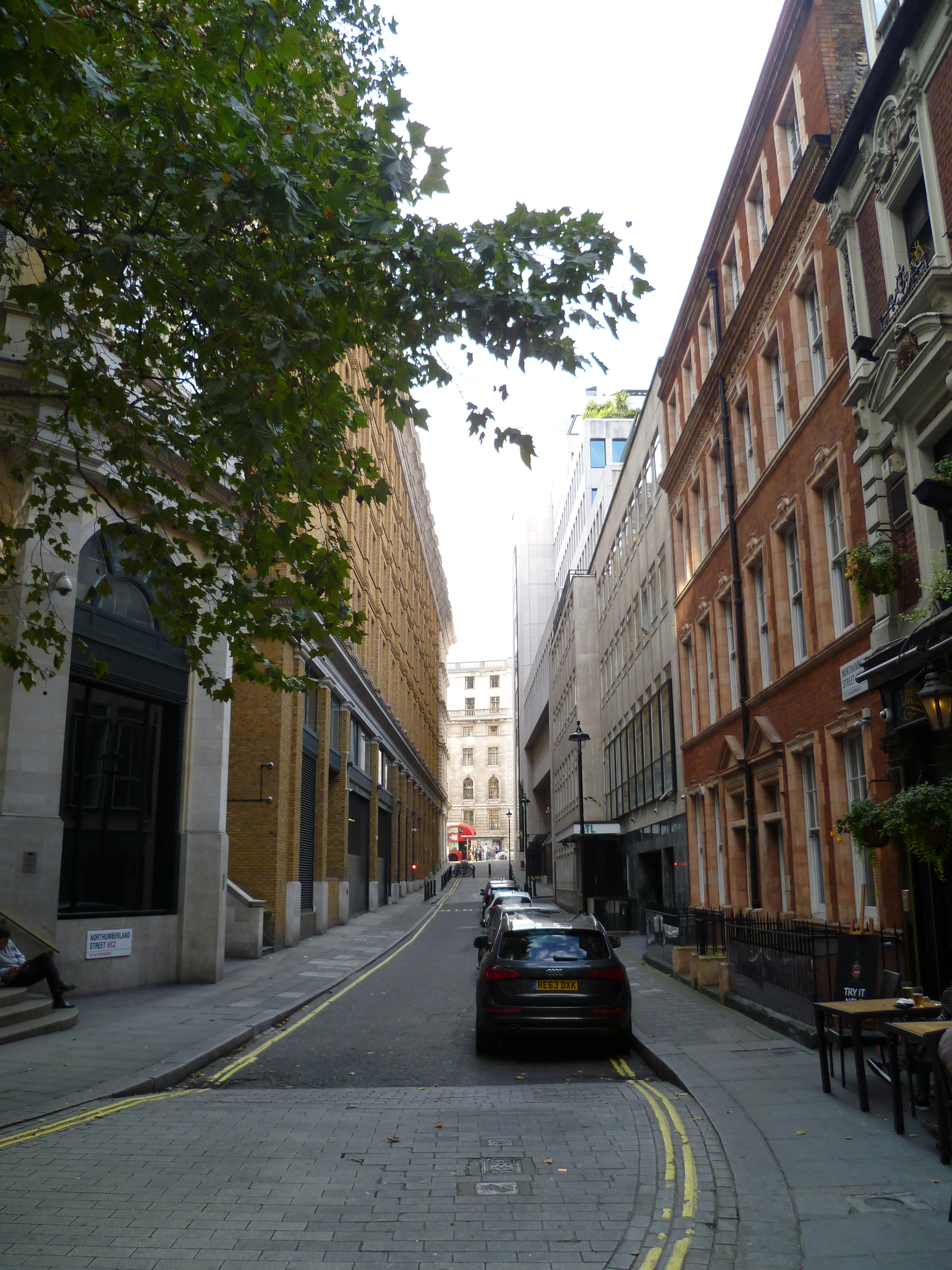
The replacement building (left) in 2015

Like many other London clubs, the Constitutional experienced severe financial difficulties with the passing years. In 1959, they agreed to the demolition of the club's well-known, purpose-built terracotta premises, and its replacement with a new office-style building, which was completed in 1962 – this is the building which still stands on that site today, on the corner of Northumberland Avenue and Northumberland Street, opposite the Sherlock Holmes pub.

Between 1962 and 1964 the club occupied rooms in first the Junior Carlton Club and then the United Service Club, before acquiring premises of its own on St. James's Street. By the mid-1970s its membership had dwindled to only 1,000, and its financial predicament was serious enough that it had to close in 1979, with its remaining members merging with the St Stephen's Club.

== See also ==
- List of gentlemen's clubs in London
