= United Empire Club =

English gentlemen's club

The United Empire Club (UEC) was an English gentlemen's club. It was formed in 1904 with premises in Piccadilly and had many high-profile members, including John Campbell, 9th Duke of Argyll, Sir Sandford Fleming, Sir Samuel Boulton, Sir Edmund Fremantle, Matthew White Ridley, 2nd Viscount Ridley, Alfred Milner, 1st Viscount Milner, and Sir Charles Tupper. Its subsequent history is unclear, although there is a current organisation by that name that claims to be descended from the original.
