= Grade I listed buildings in the City of Westminster =

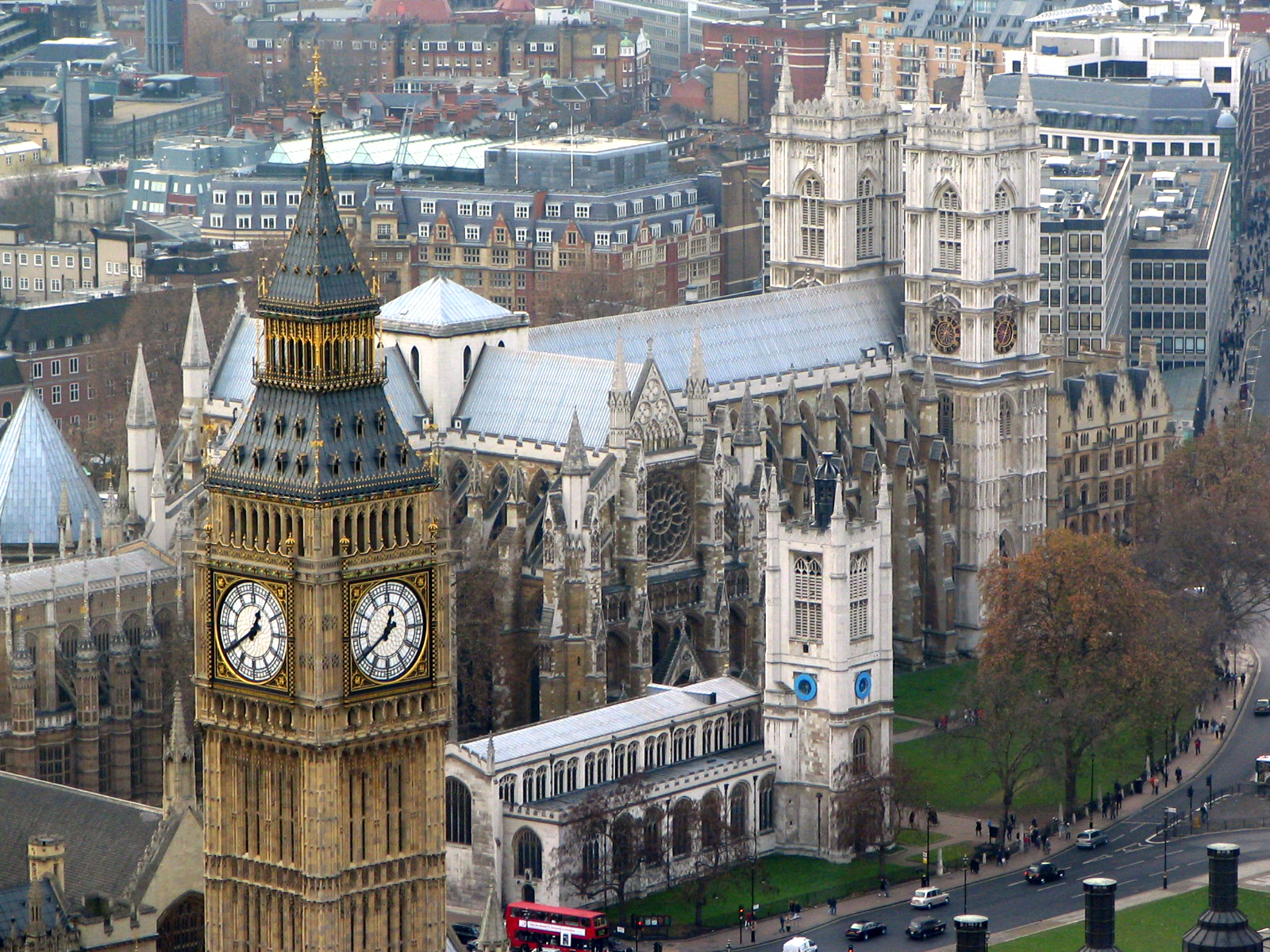
An aerial view of three Grade I listed buildings in Westminster: The Palace of Westminster, Westminster Abbey and St Margaret's Church, which together comprise a UNESCO World Heritage Site.

There are over 9,000 Grade I listed buildings in England. This page is a list of these buildings in the City of Westminster.

== Buildings ==
=== Bayswater ===
Name	Location	Type	Architect	Completed (Note: The date given is the date used by Historic England as significant for the initial building or that of an important part in the structure's description.)	Date designated	Grid ref. (Note: The grid reference is based on the British national grid reference system, sometimes known as OSGB36, used by the Ordnance Survey.) Geo-coordinates	Entry number (Note: The "List Entry Number" is a unique number assigned to each listed building and scheduled monument by Historic England.)	Image
New West End Synagogue	St Petersburgh Place W2	Synagogue	George Ashdown Audsley (with Nathan S. Joseph)	1877–1879	27 Jun 1975	TQ2568580683; 51°30′40″N 0°11′25″W	1264769	New West End Synagogue More images
St Sophia's Cathedral and presbytery	Moscow Road W2	Greek Orthodox cathedral	John Oldrid Scott	1878–1879	1 Dec 1987	TQ2557480836; 51°30′45″N 0°11′30″W	1223553	St Sophia's Cathedral and presbytery More images

=== Belgravia ===
Name	Location	Type	Architect	Completed	Date designated	Grid ref. Geo-coordinates	Entry number	Image
180 Ebury Street	Ebury Street SW1	Terraced house	—	Early to mid-18th century	24 Feb 1958	TQ2835378563; 51°29′29″N 0°09′09″W	1211215	180 Ebury Street More images
1–11 Belgrave Square	Belgrave Square SW1	Terrace	George Basevi	c. 1825	24 Feb 1958	TQ2817379494; 51°29′59″N 0°09′17″W	1066455	1–11 Belgrave Square More images
13–23 Belgrave Square	Belgrave Square SW1	Terrace	George Basevi	c. 1825	24 Feb 1958	TQ2815879330; 51°29′54″N 0°09′18″W	1066457	13–23 Belgrave Square More images
25–36 Belgrave Square	Belgrave Square SW1	Terrace	George Basevi	c. 1825	24 Feb 1958	TQ2839279372; 51°29′55″N 0°09′06″W	1292018	25–36 Belgrave Square More images
38–48 Belgrave Square	Belgrave Square SW1	Terrace	George Basevi	c. 1825	24 Feb 1958	TQ2832979534; 51°30′01″N 0°09′09″W	1292022	38–48 Belgrave Square More images
Portuguese Embassy	12 Belgrave Square SW1	Town house	Sir Robert Smirke	c. 1840–50	24 Feb 1958	TQ2810479419; 51°29′57″N 0°09′21″W	1066456	Portuguese Embassy More images
Spanish Embassy	24 Belgrave Square SW1	Town house	Henry E. Kendall	c. 1840–50	24 Feb 1958	TQ2826479271; 51°29′52″N 0°09′13″W	1218320	Spanish Embassy More images

==== Buckingham Palace complex ====
Name	Location	Type	Architect	Completed	Date designated	Grid ref. Geo-coordinates	Entry number	Image
Buckingham Palace	Buckingham Palace SW1	Royal palace	John Nash, Edward Blore and Sir Aston Webb	1705 (Buckingham House); 1826–1913	5 Feb 1970	TQ2899779614; 51°30′03″N 0°08′35″W	1239087	Buckingham Palace More images
Summer house in Buckingham Palace Garden	Buckingham Palace SW1	Summer house	—	Early to mid-18th century	5 Feb 1970	TQ2862179758; 51°30′08″N 0°08′54″W	1239210	Summer house in Buckingham Palace Garden More images
Buckingham Palace Riding School	Buckingham Palace Road SW1	Riding school	—	1764	5 Feb 1970	TQ2895979442; 51°29′57″N 0°08′37″W	1239207	Buckingham Palace Riding School More images
Boundary walls enclosing grounds and walls to Buckingham Palace gardens	Constitution Hill, Grosvenor Place, Lower Grosvenor Place SW1	Boundary wall	—	18th century	5 Feb 1970	TQ2853079779; 51°30′08″N 0°08′59″W	1239209	Boundary walls enclosing grounds and walls to Buckingham Palace gardens More images
Lodge to North of entrance to Royal Mews, Buckingham Palace Lodges, North and South Entrance to Royal Mews	Buckingham Palace Road SW1	Lodge	—	Early 19th century	5 Feb 1970	TQ2894579383; 51°29′55″N 0°08′38″W	1239205	Lodge to North of entrance to Royal Mews, Buckingham Palace Lodges, North and South Entrance to Royal Mews More images
Lodge to South of entrance to Royal Mews, Buckingham Palace Lodges, North and South entrance to Royal Mews	Buckingham Palace Road SW1	Lodge	—	Early 19th century	5 Feb 1970	TQ2892879352; 51°29′54″N 0°08′38″W	1239204	Lodge to South of entrance to Royal Mews, Buckingham Palace Lodges, North and South entrance to Royal Mews More images
Wall linking Palace and Riding School, along Buckingham Palace Road	Buckingham Palace Road SW1	Wall	—	Early 19th century	5 Feb 1970	TQ2899279471; 51°29′58″N 0°08′35″W	1239208	Wall linking Palace and Riding School, along Buckingham Palace Road More images
Waterloo Vase	Buckingham Palace Garden	Urn	Sir Richard Westmacott (sculptor)	1812	5 Feb 1970	TQ2861579722; 51°30′07″N 0°08′54″W	1239244	Waterloo Vase More images
Royal Mews	Buckingham Palace Road SW1	Mews	—	1824–5	5 Feb 1970	TQ2887479355; 51°29′54″N 0°08′41″W	1066364	Royal Mews More images
North screen to Buckingham Palace forecourt with gateway to gardens	Buckingham Palace SW1	Gate	John Nash	c. 1830	5 Feb 1970	TQ2901079730; 51°30′06″N 0°08′34″W	1273844	North screen to Buckingham Palace forecourt with gateway to gardens More images
Gates, railings, piers and gate piers with lamps fronting Buckingham Gate and as entrance to Ambassadors’ Court	Buckingham Palace SW1	Gate	—	c. 1830	5 Feb 1970	TQ2910179551; 51°30′01″N 0°08′29″W	1239211	Gates, railings, piers and gate piers with lamps fronting Buckingham Gate and as entrance to Ambassadors’ Court More images
South screen to Buckingham Palace Forecourt Backing Onto Ambassadors' Court	Buckingham Palace SW1	Gate	probably Edward Blore	c. 1836	5 Feb 1970	TQ2909579610; 51°30′02″N 0°08′30″W	1239088	South screen to Buckingham Palace Forecourt Backing Onto Ambassadors' Court More images
Forecourt gate piers, gates, railings and lamps	Buckingham Palace SW1	Gate	Sir Aston Webb, incorporating an earlier gate by Edward Blore	1901–11	5 Feb 1970	TQ2910579705; 51°30′06″N 0°08′29″W	1239251	Forecourt gate piers, gates, railings and lamps More images
Victoria Memorial	Queen Victoria Memorial Garden	Sculpture	Sir Thomas Brock	1901–11	5 Feb 1970	TQ2915479739; 51°30′07″N 0°08′26″W	1273864	Victoria Memorial More images
Queen Victoria Memorial Gates and Gatepiers, Balustrades, Steps and Retaining Wall with Fountain Framing West End of the Mall	Queen Victoria Memorial Garden	Balustrade	Sir Aston Webb	1901–11	5 Feb 1970	TQ2911279822; 51°30′09″N 0°08′28″W	1239086	Queen Victoria Memorial Gates and Gatepiers, Balustrades, Steps and Retaining Wall with Fountain Framing West End of the Mall More images

=== Charing Cross / Trafalgar Square ===
Name	Location	Type	Architect	Completed	Date designated	Grid ref. Geo-coordinates	Entry number	Image
Equestrian statue of Charles I	Charing Cross SW1	Equestrian statue	Hubert Le Sueur (sculptor)	1633	9 Jan 1970	TQ3003780373; 51°30′26″N 0°07′40″W	1357291	Equestrian statue of Charles I More images
Statue of James II	Trafalgar Square WC2	Statue	Peter van Dievoet and Laurens van der Meulen (sculptors); Grinling Gibbons (workshop)	1686	5 Feb 1970	TQ2994080498; 51°30′31″N 0°07′45″W	1217629	Statue of James II More images
St Martin-in-the-Fields	Trafalgar Square WC2	Parish church	James Gibbs	1722–1726	24 Feb 1958	TQ3010280541; 51°30′32″N 0°07′36″W	1217661	St Martin-in-the-Fields More images
Churchyard walls and railings surrounding St Martin in the Fields on north, south, east and west sides	Trafalgar Square WC2	Wall	James Gibbs	c. 1726	1 Dec 1987	TQ3011880567; 51°30′33″N 0°07′35″W	1066237	Churchyard walls and railings surrounding St Martin in the Fields on north, south, east and west sides More images
National Gallery	Trafalgar Square WC2	Public art gallery	William Wilkins (extended by Edward Middleton Barry, Sir John Taylor and others)	1832–1838	5 Feb 1970	TQ2996180544; 51°30′32″N 0°07′43″W	1066236	National Gallery More images
Nelson's Column	Trafalgar Square WC2	Column	William Railton (statue of Nelson by Edward Hodges Baily; lions by Sir Edwin Landseer)	1839–1842	5 Feb 1970	TQ3001780419; 51°30′28″N 0°07′41″W	1276052	Nelson's Column More images
Admiralty Arch, First Sea Lord's Residence and Offices, Balustrades and Steps	Charing Cross SW1	Apartment	Sir Aston Webb	1906–1911	5 Feb 1970	TQ2997080305; 51°30′24″N 0°07′43″W	1238982	Admiralty Arch, First Sea Lord's Residence and Offices, Balustrades and Steps More images
National Gallery Sainsbury Wing	Trafalgar Square WC2	Public art gallery	Robert Venturi, Denise Scott Brown and Associates	1988–1991	9 May 2018	TQ2988580510; 51°30′31″N 0°07′47″W	1451082	National Gallery Sainsbury Wing More images
Edith Cavell Memorial	St Martin's Place WC2	Statue	George Frampton	1920	5 Feb 1970	TQ2995380649; 51°30′34″N 0°07′38″W	1264768	Edith Cavell Memorial More images

=== Covent Garden ===
Name	Location	Type	Architect	Completed	Date designated	Grid ref. Geo-coordinates	Entry number	Image
St Paul's, Covent Garden	Covent Garden Piazza / Bedford Street WC2	Parish church	Inigo Jones (restored by Thomas Hardwick and altered by Henry Clutton)	1631–1638	24 Feb 1958	TQ3030080849; 51°30′42″N 0°07′25″W	1066487	St Paul's, Covent Garden More images
Theatre Royal, Drury Lane and attached Sir Augustus Harris Memorial Drinking Fountain	Catherine Street / Drury Lane WC2	Theatre and drinking fountain	Benjamin Dean Wyatt (additions and alterations by Samuel Beazley and others)	1811–1812	24 Feb 1958	TQ3053781017; 51°30′47″N 0°07′13″W	1357276	Theatre Royal, Drury Lane and attached Sir Augustus Harris Memorial Drinking Fountain More images
Royal Opera House	Bow Street / Floral Street WC2	Opera house	Edward Middleton Barry	1857–1858	9 Jan 1970	TQ3036281019; 51°30′47″N 0°07′22″W	1066392	Royal Opera House More images

=== Hyde Park ===
Name	Location	Type	Architect	Completed	Date designated	Grid ref. Geo-coordinates	Entry number	Image
Apsley House	Hyde Park Corner / 149 Piccadilly W1	Town house	Robert Adam (remodelled by Benjamin and Philip Wyatt; further alterations by Philip Hardwick)	1771–1778	5 Feb 1970	TQ2838279901; 51°30′12″N 0°09′06″W	1226873	Apsley House More images
Forecourt railings, piers and gates to Apsley House	Hyde Park Corner / 149 Piccadilly W1	Gate	—	c. 1828	5 Feb 1970	TQ2838979882; 51°30′12″N 0°09′06″W	1265623	Forecourt railings, piers and gates to Apsley House More images
Royal Artillery Memorial	Hyde Park Corner	Sculpture	Charles Sargeant Jagger and Lionel Pearson	1925	14 January 1970	TQ2836579801; 51°30′09″N 0°09′07″W	1231613	Royal Artillery Memorial More images
Screen at Hyde Park Corner Entrance	Hyde Park Corner	Colonnade	Decimus Burton	c. 1825	14 Jan 1970	TQ2833879873; 51°30′12″N 0°09′08″W	1278089	Screen at Hyde Park Corner Entrance More images
Marble Arch	Marble Arch W1	Triumphal arch	John Nash	1828	5 Feb 1970	TQ2785280968; 51°30′47″N 0°09′32″W	1239534	Marble Arch More images
Wellington Arch	Hyde Park Corner	Triumphal arch	Decimus Burton (sculptural group by Adrian Jones)	1846	9 Jan 1970	TQ2844479799; 51°30′09″N 0°09′03″W	1278092	Wellington Arch More images

=== Kensington ===
Name	Location	Type	Architect	Completed	Date designated	Grid ref. Geo-coordinates	Entry number	Image
Albert Memorial	Kensington Gore SW7	Commemorative monument	Sir George Gilbert Scott	1862–75	14 Jan 1970	TQ2657879738; 51°30′09″N 0°10′40″W	1217741	Albert Memorial More images
Royal Albert Hall	Kensington Gore SW7	Public hall	Francis Fowke (completed by Henry Young Darracott Scott)	1867–71	24 Feb 1958	TQ2660279585; 51°30′04″N 0°10′39″W	1217742	Royal Albert Hall More images
Holy Trinity Church	Prince Consort Road SW7	Church	George Frederick Bodley	1901–7	24 Feb 1958	TQ2650579467; 51°30′00″N 0°10′44″W	1265499	Holy Trinity Church More images

=== Kilburn ===
Name	Location	Type	Architect	Completed	Date designated	Grid ref. Geo-coordinates	Entry number	Image
St Augustine's Church	Kilburn Park Road NW8	Church	John Loughborough Pearson	1870–7	25 Sep 1951	TQ2553083130; 51°31′59″N 0°11′30″W	1221320	St Augustine's Church More images

=== Maida Vale ===
Name	Location	Type	Architect	Completed	Date designated	Grid ref. Geo-coordinates	Entry number	Image
Catholic Apostolic Church and Church House	Maida Avenue W2	Irvingite church and adjoining caretaker's house	John Loughborough Pearson	1891–3	5 Feb 1970	TQ2645282020; 51°31′23″N 0°10′43″W	1238911	Catholic Apostolic Church and Church House More images

=== Marylebone ===
Name	Location	Type	Architect	Completed	Date designated	Grid ref. Geo-coordinates	Entry number	Image
St Peter, Vere Street	Marylebone	Church	James Gibbs	1721–4	10 Sep 1954	TQ2866181239; 51°30′56″N 0°08′50″W	1357345	St Peter, Vere Street More images
Chandos House	2 Queen Anne Street W1	Terraced house	Robert Adam	1769–71	10 Sep 1954	TQ2879681589; 51°31′07″N 0°08′42″W	1227332	Chandos House More images
Stratford House, the Oriental Club	Marylebone	Town house	Richard Edwin	1771–3	10 Sep 1954	TQ2850181234; 51°30′56″N 0°08′58″W	1237107	Stratford House, the Oriental Club More images
21 Portman Square	Portman Square, Marylebone W1H 6LW	Terraced house	James Adam	c. 1772	10 Sep 1954	TQ2798681308; 51°30′58″N 0°09′25″W	1227092	21 Portman Square More images
Home House	20 Portman Square, Marylebone W1H 6LW	Terraced house	Robert Adam	1773–6	10 Sep 1954	TQ2799881305; 51°30′58″N 0°09′24″W	1227105	Home House More images
10 Portman Close	Marylebone	Mews	—	c. 1776	1 Dec 1987	TQ2798881351; 51°31′00″N 0°09′25″W	1227091	10 Portman Close More images
St Marylebone Parish Church	Marylebone	Parish church	Thomas Hardwick	1813–18	10 Sep 1954	TQ2828582034; 51°31′22″N 0°09′08″W	1239817	St Marylebone Parish Church More images
St Mary's, Bryanston Square	Marylebone	Parish church	Sir Robert Smirke	1821–3	10 Sep 1954	TQ2762681702; 51°31′11″N 0°09′43″W	1224993	St Mary's, Bryanston Square More images
Holy Trinity Church	Marylebone	Former church	Sir John Soane	1825–7	10 Sep 1954	TQ2887482239; 51°31′28″N 0°08′38″W	1267658	Holy Trinity Church More images
All Saints, Margaret Street with church house (7 Margaret Street) and vestry (8 Margaret Street), including railings to basement area and attached pair of lamp standards	Margaret Street W1	Church and adjoining clergy house	William Butterfield	1849–59	10 Sep 1954	TQ2922681459; 51°31′02″N 0°08′20″W	1239569	All Saints, Margaret Street with church house (7 Margaret Street) and vestry (8 Margaret Street), including railings to basement area and attached pair of lamp standards More images
All Souls Church, Langham Place	Langham Place W1	Parish church	John Nash	1822–24	10 Sep 1954	TQ2922681459; 51°31′05″N 0°08′36″W	1221802	All Souls Church, Langham Place More images

=== Mayfair ===
Name	Location	Type	Architect	Completed	Date designated	Grid ref. Geo-coordinates	Entry number	Image
31 Old Burlington Street	Mayfair, W1S 3AS	Terraced town house	Colen Campbell	1718–24	24 Feb 1958	TQ2912280674; 51°30′37″N 0°08′27″W	1225471	31 Old Burlington Street More images
St George's, Hanover Square	Hanover Square W1	Parish church	John James	1720–4	24 Feb 1958	TQ2897380927; 51°30′45″N 0°08′34″W	1235638	St George's, Hanover Square More images
George Frideric Handel's house	25 Brook Street, W1K 4HB	Terraced house	—	c. 1725	24 Feb 1958	TQ2875580967; 51°30′47″N 0°08′45″W	1066382	George Frideric Handel's house More images
Grosvenor Estate Office	66 Brook Street and 53 Davies Street, Mayfair, W1K 5JH	Terraced town house	Edward Shepherd (No. 66); Thomas Cundy (No. 53)	c. 1725–30 (No. 66); 1820s–30s (No. 53)	24 Feb 1958	TQ2856680954; 51°30′46″N 0°08′55″W	1219812	Grosvenor Estate Office More images
44 Berkeley Square	Mayfair, W1	Terraced town house	William Kent	1742–1744	24 Feb 1958	TQ2871480555; 51°30′33″N 0°08′48″W	1066466	44 Berkeley Square More images
45 and 46 Berkeley Square	Mayfair, W1	Terraced town houses, 46 is home to Annabel's private member's club	Henry Flitcroft (No. 45; no. 46 attributed to him)	c. 1744–50	24 Feb 1958	TQ2872080548; 51°30′33″N 0°08′48″W	1218401	45 and 46 Berkeley Square More images
17 Hill Street	Mayfair, W1	Terraced town house	Benjamin Timbrell; additions and alterations by Robert Adam	1748–9; 1777–9	24 Feb 1958	TQ2862380490; 51°30′31″N 0°08′53″W	1066622	17 Hill Street More images
Royal Institution	21 Albemarle Street W1	Headquarters converted from terraced town house	Thomas Webster (1799); Lewis Vulliamy (façade, 1838)	1756; 1799; 1838	24 Feb 1958	TQ2900480621; 51°30′35″N 0°08′33″W	1066521	Royal Institution More images
Part of the Royal Institution	20 Albemarle Street W1	Terraced house	—	Late 18th century; remodelled internally early and late 19th century	9 Jan 1970	TQ2902380601; 51°30′35″N 0°08′32″W	1066520	Part of the Royal Institution More images
Cambridge House	94 Piccadilly and 12 White Horse Street W1	Town mansion	Matthew Brettingham	1756–60	24 Feb 1958	TQ2881680190; 51°30′21″N 0°08′43″W	1226748	Cambridge House More images
3–6 Grafton Street with 10 Bruton Lane	Mayfair, W1	Terraced town houses	Sir Robert Taylor	c. 1760–72	24 Feb 1958	TQ2891180604; 51°30′35″N 0°08′38″W	1289151	3–6 Grafton Street with 10 Bruton Lane More images
London Park School Mayfair	106 Piccadilly W1	Town house	Robert Adam (1st-floor interiors, 1765); Thomas Cundy Sr. (remodelling, c. 1810–1811)	c. 1761	24 Feb 1958	TQ2872480092; 51°30′18″N 0°08′48″W	1226811	London Park School Mayfair More images
10 Hertford Street	Mayfair, W1	Terraced town house	Henry Holland Sr. and Henry Holland Jr.; interior by Robert Adam	c. 1768–9; interior 1769–71	24 Feb 1958	TQ2863980148; 51°30′20″N 0°08′52″W	1230913	10 Hertford Street More images
Crockford's	30 Curzon Street W1	Terraced town house	Robert Adam (interior)	1771	24 Feb 1958	TQ2855580236; 51°30′23″N 0°08′57″W	1356991	Crockford's More images
Melbourne House	Albany W1	Town mansion	Sir William Chambers; altered by Henry Holland (Jr.)	1771–6; 1802–3	24 Feb 1958	TQ2926380548; 51°30′33″N 0°08′20″W	1357178	Melbourne House More images
Albany Courtyard	1–6 Albany W1	Flanking forecourt wings of town mansion	Sir William Chambers	1771–6	24 Feb 1958	TQ2927480520; 51°30′32″N 0°08′19″W	1209755	Albany Courtyard More images
Ely House	37 Dover Street W1	Terraced town house	Sir Robert Taylor	1772	24 Feb 1958	TQ2899880474; 51°30′31″N 0°08′33″W	1066901	Ely House More images
Bodley House Chambers	Albany; also Vigo Street and 8, 10 and 12 Burlington Gardens W1	Apartments	Henry Holland	1802–3	24 Feb 1958	TQ2919780654; 51°30′36″N 0°08′23″W	1209773	Bodley House Chambers More images
93 Park Lane	Park Lane W1	Terraced town house	Samuel Baxter	1823–5	24 Feb 1958	TQ2806480640; 51°30′37″N 0°09′22″W	1226023	93 Park Lane More images
Mercato Mayfair, formerly St Mark's, North Audley Street	North Audley Street W1	Former church	John Peter Gandy; body of the church remodelled by Arthur Blomfield	1825–8; 1878	24 Feb 1958	TQ2825380970; 51°30′47″N 0°09′11″W	1225301	Mercato Mayfair, formerly St Mark's, North Audley Street More images

=== Paddington ===
Name	Location	Type	Architect	Completed	Date designated	Grid ref. Geo-coordinates	Entry number	Image
Paddington Station including the lawn, GWR office block on London Street and offices along Eastbourne Terrace	Eastbourne Terrace W2	Railway station	Isambard Kingdom Brunel (engineer), Sir Matthew Digby Wyatt (architect), Owen Jones (decoration)	1851–4 (additions and alterations 1914–6 and 1930s)	11 Jan 1961	TQ2655781373; 51°31′02″N 0°10′39″W	1066881	Paddington Station including the lawn, GWR office block on London Street and offices along Eastbourne Terrace More images
St Mary Magdalene Church	Rowington Close W2	Church	George Edmund Street (Crypt Chapel of St Sepulchre by Sir Ninian Comper)	1867–78 (Crypt chapel 1895)	25 Sep 1951	TQ2573781948; 51°31′21″N 0°11′21″W	1235288	St Mary Magdalene Church More images

=== Pimlico ===
Name	Location	Type	Architect	Completed	Date designated	Grid ref. Geo-coordinates	Entry number	Image
St Barnabas Church	St Barnabas St SW1	Church	Thomas Cundy Jr., assisted by William Butterfield	1847–50	24 Feb 1958	TQ2841378446; 51°29′25″N 0°09′06″W	1265057	St Barnabas Church More images
St James the Less Church	Vauxhall Bridge Road SW1	Parish church	George Edmund Street	1859–61	24 Feb 1958	TQ2955478511; 51°29′27″N 0°08′07″W	1066164	St James the Less Church More images
St James the Less Parish Rooms and Schools	Vauxhall Bridge Road SW1	Village Hall	George Edmund Street; additions by Arthur Edmund Street	1861; 1890	5 Feb 1970	TQ2958578501; 51°29′26″N 0°08′06″W	1066166	St James the Less Parish Rooms and Schools More images

=== Regent's Park ===
Name	Location	Type	Architect	Completed	Date designated	Grid ref. Geo-coordinates	Entry number	Image
1–6 and 8–14 Park Crescent with 98 Portland Place	Park Crescent and Portland Place W1	Quadrant of town houses forming eastern half of crescent	John Nash	1812	5 Feb 1970	TQ2873882062; 51°31′22″N 0°08′45″W	1225956	1–6 and 8–14 Park Crescent with 98 Portland Place More images
18–26 Park Crescent (including the former No. 27)	Park Crescent and Portland Place W1	Quadrant of town houses forming western half of crescent	John Nash	1812	5 Feb 1970	TQ2862782061; 51°31′22″N 0°08′51″W	1225959	18–26 Park Crescent (including the former No. 27) More images
1–5 York Gate	York Gate NW1	Terrace	John Nash	c. 1821–2	5 Feb 1970	TQ2828182125; 51°31′25″N 0°09′08″W	1225218	1–5 York Gate More images
8–12 York Gate	York Gate NW1	Terrace	John Nash	1821–2	5 Feb 1970	TQ2823582110; 51°31′24″N 0°09′11″W	1357372	8–12 York Gate More images
1–21 Cornwall Terrace	Cornwall Terrace NW1	Terrace (except Nos. 20 and 21)	Decimus Burton	1821–3 (restored 1980)	9 Jan 1970	TQ2792982181; 51°31′27″N 0°09′27″W	1356971	1–21 Cornwall Terrace More images
Forecourt garden railings to Nos. 20 and 21	Cornwall Terrace NW1	Railings	Decimus Burton or John Nash	c. 1821–3	1 Dec 1987	TQ2805282125; 51°31′25″N 0°09′20″W	1066947	Forecourt garden railings to Nos. 20 and 21
1–18 York Terrace East, including 6 York Gate	York Terrace East NW1	Terrace	John Nash	c. 1821–6	5 Feb 1970	TQ2832482180; 51°31′26″N 0°09′06″W	1066044	1–18 York Terrace East, including 6 York Gate More images
Garden railings to park front of Nos. 1–18	York Terrace East NW1	Railings	John Nash	c. 1821–6	1 Dec 1987	TQ2831982198; 51°31′27″N 0°09′06″W	1225417	Garden railings to park front of Nos. 1–18
Doric Villa	19 and 20 York Terrace East NW1	Semi-detached villas as one	John Nash	c. 1821–6	5 Feb 1970	TQ2840882205; 51°31′27″N 0°09′02″W	1357399	Doric Villa More images
Garden railings to park front of Doric Villa	York Terrace East NW1	Railings	John Nash	c. 1821–6	5 Feb 1970	TQ2840282226; 51°31′28″N 0°09′02″W	1225450	Garden railings to park front of Doric Villa
1–33 York Terrace West with 7 York Gate	York Terrace West and York Gate NW1	Terrace	John Nash	c. 1821–6	5 Feb 1970	TQ2816882133; 51°31′25″N 0°09′14″W	1066047	1–33 York Terrace West with 7 York Gate More images
Garden railings to park front of Nos. 1–33	York Terrace West NW1	Railings	John Nash	c. 1821–6	1 Dec 1987	TQ2816382153; 51°31′26″N 0°09′14″W	1225553	Garden railings to park front of Nos. 1–33
47 York Terrace West	York Terrace West NW1	House	John Nash	c. 1821–6 (later rebuilt in facsimile)	1 Dec 1987	TQ2807082101; 51°31′24″N 0°09′19″W	1066048	47 York Terrace West More images
1 to 26 Sussex Place, London Graduate School of Business Studies (occupied by London Business School)	1–26 Sussex Place NW1	Terrace (rebuilt behind front as business school)	John Nash	1822–3	5 Feb 1970	TQ2768682410; 51°31′34″N 0°09′39″W	1264092	1 to 26 Sussex Place, London Graduate School of Business Studies (occupied by London Business School) More images
Garden railings in front of 1–26 Sussex Place	Sussex Place NW1	Railings	—	c. 1822–3	1 Dec 1987	TQ2773182434; 51°31′35″N 0°09′37″W	1237472	Garden railings in front of 1–26 Sussex Place More images
1–20 Hanover Terrace	Hanover Terrace NW1	Terrace	John Nash	1822–3	14 Jan 1970	TQ2753682576; 51°31′40″N 0°09′46″W	1279085	1–20 Hanover Terrace More images
Forecourt garden railings and gate piers to Nos. 1–20	Hanover Terrace NW1	Garden railings and gate piers	—	c. 1822–3	1 Dec 1987	TQ2749882644; 51°31′42″N 0°09′48″W	1066693	Forecourt garden railings and gate piers to Nos. 1–20
Nuffield Lodge	Park Road / Prince Albert Road NW1	Villa	Decimus Burton	1822–4	5 Feb 1970	TQ2725082882; 51°31′50″N 0°10′01″W	1265526	Nuffield Lodge More images
1–43 Clarence Terrace	Clarence Terrace NW1	Terrace	Decimus Burton	1823 (rebuilt 1965)	9 Jan 1970	TQ2777682325; 51°31′31″N 0°09′34″W	1357311	1–43 Clarence Terrace More images
1–12 Park Square West	Park Square West NW1	Terrace	John Nash	1823–5	5 Feb 1970	TQ2854782203; 51°31′27″N 0°08′55″W	1265975	1–12 Park Square West More images
14–26 Ulster Place	Ulster Place NW1	Manor House	John Nash	c. 1824	5 Feb 1970	TQ2854182155; 51°31′25″N 0°08′55″W	1066214	14–26 Ulster Place More images
Ulster Terrace	Ulster Terrace NW1	Terrace	John Nash	c. 1824	5 Feb 1970	TQ2851382248; 51°31′28″N 0°08′56″W	1357331	Ulster Terrace More images
34 York Terrace West	York Terrace West NW1	Terraced town house	John Nash	c. 1824–6	5 Feb 1970	TQ2810282109; 51°31′24″N 0°09′18″W	1357401	34 York Terrace West More images
Garden railings to park front of Nos. 34–47	York Terrace West NW1	Railings	John Nash	c. 1824–6	1 Dec 1987	TQ2808082128; 51°31′25″N 0°09′19″W	1225611	Garden railings to park front of Nos. 34–47 More images
35–46 York Terrace West	York Terrace West NW1	Terrace	John Nash	c. 1824–6	5 Feb 1970	TQ2808682109; 51°31′24″N 0°09′19″W	1266293	35–46 York Terrace West More images
Gorilla House	London Zoo NW1	Concrete-framed building	Berthold Lubetkin and the Tecton Group with Ove Arup	1932–3	14 Sep 1970	TQ2809483571; 51°32′11″N 0°09′16″W	1357402	Gorilla House More images
Penguin Pool	London Zoo NW1	Former penguin pool; now fountain	Berthold Lubetkin and the Tecton Group with Ove Arup	1934	14 Sep 1970	TQ2817383293; 51°32′02″N 0°09′12″W	1225665	Penguin Pool More images

=== St James's ===
Name	Location	Type	Completed	Date designated	Grid ref. Geo-coordinates	Entry number	Image
St James's Palace, and its Garden Walls, Marlborough Gate, etc.	St James's	Kitchen	c. 1533–5	5 Feb 1970	TQ2934980046; 51°30′16″N 0°08′16″W	1264851	St James's Palace, and its Garden Walls, Marlborough Gate, etc. More images
Apartment 5, St James's Palace	Charing Cross SW1	Apartment	1661, altered 1716–17	5 Feb 1970	TQ2922880012; 51°30′15″N 0°08′22″W	1264511	Apartment 5, St James's Palace
Queen's Chapel	St James's	Roman Catholic chapel	1623–7	1 Dec 1987	TQ2940580095; 51°30′18″N 0°08′13″W	1273605	Queen's Chapel More images
Dean's Residence, Queen's Chapel	St James's	Deanery	c. 1626–7	1 Dec 1987	TQ2940680086; 51°30′18″N 0°08′13″W	1239701	Dean's Residence, Queen's Chapel More images
White's Club	St James's	Gentlemen's club	1674	24 Feb 1958	TQ2918380382; 51°30′27″N 0°08′24″W	1264877	White's Club More images
St James's Church	Piccadilly	Parish church	1676–84	24 Feb 1958	TQ2940980504; 51°30′31″N 0°08′12″W	1226621	St James's Church More images
15 St James's Square	City of Westminster	Terraced town house	1764–6; altered 1791–4	24 Feb 1958	TQ2940880348; 51°30′26″N 0°08′12″W	1235826	15 St James's Square More images
Royal Over-Seas League, including Rutland House and its former gatehouse, Number 16 Arlington Street, and Vernon House	St James's	House	Late 17th/early 18th century	24 Feb 1958	TQ2915480242; 51°30′23″N 0°08′26″W	1210140	Royal Over-Seas League, including Rutland House and its former gatehouse, Number 16 Arlington Street, and Vernon House More images
Marlborough House with enclosing forecourt walls and east service/stable wing	St James's	Town House	1707–11	5 Feb 1970	TQ2946080101; 51°30′18″N 0°08′10″W	1331701	Marlborough House with enclosing forecourt walls and east service/stable wing More images
Chatham House	St James's	Terraced House	1736	24 Feb 1958	TQ2945080402; 51°30′28″N 0°08′10″W	1264939	Chatham House More images
Spencer House	St James's	Town House	1752–4	24 Feb 1958	TQ2917480112; 51°30′19″N 0°08′25″W	1264952	Spencer House More images
20 and 21 St James's Square	St James's	Terraced town houses	1771–5 and 1936	24 Feb 1958	TQ2946780255; 51°30′23″N 0°08′09″W	1264890	20 and 21 St James's Square More images
Boodle's	St James's	Gentlemen's Club	1775–6	5 Feb 1970	TQ2923380312; 51°30′25″N 0°08′21″W	1264870	Boodle's More images
Brooks's (south of Number 60)	St James's	Gentlemen's Club	1778	24 Feb 1958	TQ2919380272; 51°30′24″N 0°08′24″W	1264849	Brooks's (south of Number 60) More images
Equestrian statue of William III	St James's Square	Statue	1807	24 Feb 1958	TQ2950980346; 51°30′26″N 0°08′07″W	1235855	Equestrian statue of William III More images
Royal Opera Arcade	St James's	Gate	1816–18	5 Feb 1970	TQ2972380422; 51°30′28″N 0°07′56″W	1235289	Royal Opera Arcade More images
Lancaster House	St James's	Town House	c. 1820	5 Feb 1970	TQ2925579961; 51°30′14″N 0°08′21″W	1236546	Lancaster House More images
Haymarket Theatre (Theatre Royal)	St James's	Theatre	1820–1	14 Jan 1970	TQ2977780509; 51°30′31″N 0°07′53″W	1066641	Haymarket Theatre (Theatre Royal) More images
Rear elevation of the Haymarket Theatre	St James's	Theatre	c. 1821	5 Feb 1970	TQ2978280532; 51°30′32″N 0°07′53″W	1264252	Rear elevation of the Haymarket Theatre More images
Clarence House	St James's	Town House	1825–7	5 Feb 1970	TQ2930079979; 51°30′14″N 0°08′18″W	1236580	Clarence House More images
Institute of Directors	116–119 Pall Mall	Balustrade	1826–8	5 Feb 1970	TQ2975980353; 51°30′26″N 0°07′54″W	1225843	Institute of Directors More images
The Athenaeum	St James's	Gentlemen's club	1826–30	5 Feb 1970	TQ2968880301; 51°30′24″N 0°07′58″W	1225842	The Athenaeum More images
1–9 Carlton House Terrace including railings to North and East	St James's	Terrace	1827–9	9 Jan 1970	TQ2969580195; 51°30′21″N 0°07′58″W	1209780	1–9 Carlton House Terrace including railings to North and East More images
10–18 Carlton House Terrace (including the Institute of Contemporary Arts) and railings to North and West	St James's	Terrace	1827–9	9 Jan 1970	TQ2983980279; 51°30′24″N 0°07′50″W	1209794	10–18 Carlton House Terrace (including the Institute of Contemporary Arts) and railings to North and West More images
Travellers Club	St James's	Steps	1828–32	5 Feb 1970	TQ2966880289; 51°30′24″N 0°07′59″W	1266151	Travellers Club More images
Duke of York Column and Steps	St James's	Column	1831–4	5 Feb 1970	TQ2975780252; 51°30′23″N 0°07′54″W	1239383	Duke of York Column and Steps More images
Reform Club	St James's	Steps	1837–41	5 Feb 1970	TQ2963780274; 51°30′24″N 0°08′01″W	1225841	Reform Club More images
Bridgewater House	St James's	Town house	1854	24 Feb 1958	TQ2920380070; 51°30′17″N 0°08′23″W	1066255	Bridgewater House More images
Bridgewater House Terraces and walls on Green Park Side	Green Park	Balustrade	c. 1854	1 Dec 1987	TQ2917880054; 51°30′17″N 0°08′25″W	1219506	Bridgewater House Terraces and walls on Green Park Side More images
Queen Alexandra Memorial	St James's	Sculpture	1926–32	5 Feb 1970	TQ2941480061; 51°30′17″N 0°08′12″W	1239703	Queen Alexandra Memorial More images

=== Soho ===
Name	Location	Type	Architect	Completed	Date designated	Grid ref. Geo-coordinates	Entry number	Image
Quo Vadis restaurant	26–28 Dean Street W1	Terraced houses, now restaurant	John Nolloth(?)	c. 1734 (ground floor altered early 20th century)	14 Jan 1970	TQ2967681114; 51°30′51″N 0°07′57″W	1290584	Quo Vadis restaurant More images
House of St Barnabas	1 Greek Street W1	Corner terrace house	Joseph Pearce	c. 1744–6	24 Feb 1958	TQ2976481213; 51°30′54″N 0°07′53″W	1066753	House of St Barnabas More images
National Portrait Gallery	St Martin's Place WC2	Public art gallery	Ewan Christian and J. K. Colling	1890–5	9 Jan 1970	TQ2999580611; 51°30′34″N 0°07′42″W	1066285	National Portrait Gallery More images
Shaftesbury Memorial Fountain	Piccadilly Circus W1	Memorial fountain with sculpture	Sir Alfred Gilbert (sculptor)	1892–3	24 Feb 1958	TQ2955780644; 51°30′36″N 0°08′04″W	1265625	Shaftesbury Memorial Fountain More images

=== Strand ===
Name	Location	Type	Completed	Date designated	Grid ref. Geo-coordinates	Entry number	Image
St Clement Danes	Strand	Church	1682	24 Feb 1958	TQ3097681040; 51°30′47″N 0°06′50″W	1237099	St Clement Danes More images
12 Buckingham Street	Strand	Terraced town house	c. 1676–7 with 19th-century and later additions	24 Feb 1958	TQ3033180482; 51°30′30″N 0°07′24″W	1291053	12 Buckingham Street More images
St Mary le Strand	Strand	Church	1714–17	24 Feb 1958	TQ3077580933; 51°30′44″N 0°07′01″W	1236753	St Mary le Strand More images
Royal Society of Arts	Strand	Learned Society Building	1772–4	24 Feb 1958	TQ3037380612; 51°30′34″N 0°07′22″W	1216787	Royal Society of Arts More images
Somerset House and King's College Old Building	Strand	Gate	1776–96	5 Feb 1970	TQ3072580870; 51°30′42″N 0°07′03″W	1237041	Somerset House and King's College Old Building More images
Statue of George III, Somerset House	Strand	Statue	1780	5 Feb 1970	TQ3074180837; 51°30′41″N 0°07′03″W	1237087	Statue of George III, Somerset House More images
Benjamin Franklin House	36 Craven Street WC2	Terraced house	c. 1792	9 Jan 1970	TQ3022880412; 51°30′28″N 0°07′30″W	1066930	Benjamin Franklin House More images
Royal Courts of Justice	Strand	Law Court	1874–82	5 Feb 1970	TQ3100381157; 51°30′51″N 0°06′49″W	1264258	Royal Courts of Justice More images
Screen Walls, Gates, Railings and Lamps to the Law Courts	Strand	Gate	c. 1874	5 Feb 1970	TQ3096181076; 51°30′48″N 0°06′51″W	1237101	Screen Walls, Gates, Railings and Lamps to the Law Courts More images

=== Temple ===
Name	Location	Type	Completed	Date designated	Grid ref. Geo-coordinates	Entry number	Image
Chambers on West side of New Court	Middle Temple	Inns of Court	1676	4 Jan 1950	TQ3108380996; 51°30′46″N 0°06′45″W	1064616	Chambers on West side of New Court More images

=== Victoria ===
Name	Location	Type	Completed	Date designated	Grid ref. Geo-coordinates	Entry number	Image
55 Broadway (including St James's Park tube station)	Westminster	Office building	1927–1929	9 Jan 1970	TQ2960079486; 51°29′58″N 0°08′03″W	1219790	55 Broadway (including St James's Park tube station) More images

=== Victoria Embankment ===
Name	Location	Type	Completed	Date designated	Grid ref. Geo-coordinates	Entry number	Image
Cleopatra's Needle	Victoria Embankment	Obelisk	1500 BC	24 Feb 1958	TQ3054380516; 51°30′31″N 0°07′13″W	1066169	Cleopatra's Needle More images
York Water Gate	Victoria Embankment	Water gate	1626	24 Feb 1958	TQ3036480471; 51°30′29″N 0°07′23″W	1237938	York Water Gate More images
Norman Shaw North Building	Victoria Embankment	Government offices	1887–90	5 Feb 1970	TQ3028179813; 51°30′08″N 0°07′28″W	1274511	Norman Shaw North Building More images

=== Westminster ===
Name	Location	Type	Completed	Date designated	Grid ref. Geo-coordinates	Entry number	Image
Palace of Westminster	Parliament Square SW1	Houses of Parliament (former royal palace)	1097–9 (Westminster Hall) and later; major rebuilding 1835–60	5 Feb 1970	TQ3026779504; 51°29′58″N 0°07′29″W	1226284	Palace of Westminster More images
Victoria Tower Lodge and gates to Black Rod Garden	Westminster	Gate lodge	c. 1850–60	1 Dec 1987	TQ3021179354; 51°29′53″N 0°07′32″W	1066149	Victoria Tower Lodge and gates to Black Rod Garden More images
Gates, railings and gate piers to New Palace Yard, Houses of Parliament	Westminster	Gate	c. 1860–7	5 Feb 1970	TQ3017679624; 51°30′02″N 0°07′33″W	1265947	Gates, railings and gate piers to New Palace Yard, Houses of Parliament More images
Jewel Tower of the Palace of Westminster	Westminster	Royal palace	1364–6	5 Feb 1970	TQ3014879387; 51°29′54″N 0°07′35″W	1225529	Jewel Tower of the Palace of Westminster More images
Former Dock Retaining Walls to Moat Around Jewel House	Westminster	Wall	Medieval	5 Feb 1970	TQ3014179391; 51°29′55″N 0°07′36″W	1266310	Former Dock Retaining Walls to Moat Around Jewel House More images
5-13 (odd) Queen Anne's Gate	Westminster	Terraced houses	1770–1	24 Feb 1958	TQ2970179598; 51°30′02″N 0°07′58″W	1227241	5-13 (odd) Queen Anne's Gate More images
14-22 (even), 22a and 24 Queen Anne's Gate	Westminster	Terraced houses	1775–8	24 Feb 1958	TQ2970779628; 51°30′03″N 0°07′58″W	1227298	14-22 (even), 22a and 24 Queen Anne's Gate More images
15 Queen Anne's Gate	Westminster	Terraced house	c. 1700–4	24 Feb 1958	TQ2968179590; 51°30′01″N 0°07′59″W	1265463	15 Queen Anne's Gate More images
17 and 19 Queen Anne's Gate	Westminster	Terraced houses	c. 1700–4	24 Feb 1958	TQ2967079588; 51°30′01″N 0°08′00″W	1227295	17 and 19 Queen Anne's Gate More images
21 and 23 Queen Anne's Gate	Westminster	Terraced houses	c. 1700–4	24 Feb 1958	TQ2965279588; 51°30′01″N 0°08′01″W	1227296	21 and 23 Queen Anne's Gate More images
25 Queen Anne's Gate	Westminster	Terraced house	c. 1700–4	24 Feb 1958	TQ2963679585; 51°30′01″N 0°08′01″W	1265450	25 Queen Anne's Gate More images
26-32 (even) Queen Anne's Gate	Westminster	Terraced houses	c. 1700–4	24 Feb 1958	TQ2966279624; 51°30′02″N 0°08′00″W	1227299	26-32 (even) Queen Anne's Gate More images
40 Queen Anne's Gate	Westminster	Terraced house	c. 1700–4, with early 19th-century additions	24 Feb 1958	TQ2960379594; 51°30′02″N 0°08′03″W	1227300	40 Queen Anne's Gate More images
42 Queen Anne's Gate	Westminster	Terraced house	c. 1700–4	24 Feb 1958	TQ2961279592; 51°30′01″N 0°08′03″W	1227328	42 Queen Anne's Gate More images
44 Queen Anne's Gate	Westminster	Terraced house	c. 1700–4, with early 19th-century parapet	24 Feb 1958	TQ2961279584; 51°30′01″N 0°08′03″W	1227329	44 Queen Anne's Gate More images
46 Queen Anne's Gate	Westminster	Terraced house	c. 1700–4	24 Feb 1958	TQ2961179577; 51°30′01″N 0°08′03″W	1265430	46 Queen Anne's Gate More images
Statue of Queen Anne	Queen Anne's Gate SW1	Statue	Before 1708	5 Feb 1970	TQ2968379601; 51°30′02″N 0°07′59″W	1227294	Statue of Queen Anne More images
Blewcoat School	Caxton Street SW1	Shop	1709	15 May 1954	TQ2948179362; 51°29′54″N 0°08′10″W	1210081	Blewcoat School More images
St John's, Smith Square	Smith Square	Concert hall (former church)	1713–28	24 Feb 1958	TQ3011179111; 51°29′46″N 0°07′37″W	1236250	St John's, Smith Square More images
Westminster Cathedral	Ashley Place SW1	Roman Catholic cathedral	1895–1903	1 Dec 1987	TQ2924879074; 51°29′45″N 0°08′22″W	1066500	Westminster Cathedral More images
The Burghers of Calais	Victoria Tower Gardens	Statuary group	1915	5 Feb 1970	TQ3026379286; 51°29′51″N 0°07′29″W	1066150	The Burghers of Calais More images

==== Abbey Precinct and Westminster School ====
Name	Location	Type	Completed	Date designated	Grid ref. Geo-coordinates	Entry number	Image
Westminster Abbey	Broad Sanctuary SW1	Abbey	1050–65	24 Feb 1958	TQ3008279490; 51°29′58″N 0°07′38″W	1291494	Westminster Abbey More images
St Margaret's Church	Parliament Square SW1	Parish church	11th / 12th century	24 Feb 1958	TQ3012479547; 51°30′00″N 0°07′36″W	1226286	St Margaret's Church More images
The Great Cloisters of Westminster Abbey, including St Faiths Chapel, the Chapter House, the Parlour, numbers 1 and 2 the Cloisters, the Dark Cloisters and Dormitory with the Chapel of St Dunstan	Abbey Precinct and Westminster School	Manor House	11th century	24 Feb 1958	TQ3007279452; 51°29′57″N 0°07′39″W	1066370	The Great Cloisters of Westminster Abbey, including St Faiths Chapel, the Chapter House, the Parlour, numbers 1 and 2 the Cloisters, the Dark Cloisters and Dormitory with the Chapel of St Dunstan More images
The Deanery and Sub Dean's Residence with the Jericho Parlour	Abbey Precinct and Westminster School	Building	c. 1370	23 Sep 1966	TQ2999579469; 51°29′57″N 0°07′43″W	1066375	The Deanery and Sub Dean's Residence with the Jericho Parlour More images
19, 19a and 20 Broad Sanctuary	Abbey Precinct and Westminster School	Guest House	Late 14th century and 15th century	24 Feb 1958	TQ3001479417; 51°29′55″N 0°07′42″W	1219626	19, 19a and 20 Broad Sanctuary More images
Ashburnham House	Little Dean's Yard SW1	Town House	Before 1662	24 Feb 1958	TQ3004679409; 51°29′55″N 0°07′40″W	1219461	Ashburnham House More images
College Dormitory, Westminster School	4 Little Dean’s Yard SW1	Manor House	1722–30	9 Jan 1970	TQ3006879348; 51°29′53″N 0°07′39″W	1066372	College Dormitory, Westminster School More images
Abbey Precinct Wall	Great College Street SW1	Gate	Early medieval and c. 1374 with later additions and alterations	24 Feb 1958	TQ3014879337; 51°29′53″N 0°07′35″W	1357235	Abbey Precinct Wall More images
Clerk of the Works Office and the remains of the Chapel of St Catherine, Little Cloisters Lodgings	Abbey Precinct and Westminster School	Abbey	Late 14th century	24 Feb 1958	TQ3010879406; 51°29′55″N 0°07′37″W	1357234	Clerk of the Works Office and the remains of the Chapel of St Catherine, Little Cloisters Lodgings More images
18 Dean's Yard	Abbey Precinct and Westminster School	Guest House	1461	24 Feb 1958	TQ3001479375; 51°29′54″N 0°07′42″W	1066406	18 Dean's Yard More images
17 Dean's Yard	Abbey Precinct and Westminster School	Teachers House	Late 18th century	24 Feb 1958	TQ3001479357; 51°29′54″N 0°07′42″W	1219607	17 Dean's Yard More images
Little Deans Yard	Abbey Precinct and Westminster School	Teachers House	1789–90	24 Feb 1958	TQ3005279357; 51°29′54″N 0°07′40″W	1066371	Little Deans Yard More images
Little Deans Yard Staircase to Doorway and Gateway to School and Busby Library	Abbey Precinct and Westminster School	Manor House	1734	9 Jan 1970	TQ3007079389; 51°29′55″N 0°07′39″W	1066373	Little Deans Yard Staircase to Doorway and Gateway to School and Busby Library More images

=== Whitehall ===
Name	Location	Type	Architect	Completed	Date designated	Grid ref. Geo-coordinates	Entry number	Image
Queen Mary's Steps and fragment of Whitehall Palace	Horse Guards Avenue SW1	Part of former riverside terrace and steps and remains of palace wall	Sir Christopher Wren (steps)	Tudor and 1691–3	14 Jan 1970	TQ3029780072; 51°30′16″N 0°07′27″W	1066636	Queen Mary's Steps and fragment of Whitehall Palace More images
Ministry of Defence Main Building	Horse Guards Avenue SW1	Government offices incorporating Tudor palace undercroft and historic rooms from the site	Sir William Chambers (rooms from Pembroke House); Vincent Harris (government offices)	c. 1530 (undercroft of York Place, later Whitehall Palace); c. 1757, 1760 and 1773 (rooms from Pembroke House); c. 1722 (room from Cromwell House)	14 Jan 1970	TQ3024080010; 51°30′14″N 0°07′30″W	1278223	Ministry of Defence Main Building More images
Treasury Buildings	Whitehall SW1	Government offices with remains of former palace	William Kent, Sir John Soane and Sir Charles Barry	c. 1530 (remains of Whitehall Palace); c. 1700–10/11 (Dover House); 1733–6 (Kent's "new" Treasury); 1824–7 (Privy Council and Cabinet Offices; these remodelled 1845–7 and 1960–4)	5 Feb 1970	TQ3012079956; 51°30′13″N 0°07′36″W	1267063	Treasury Buildings More images
Banqueting House	Whitehall SW1	Former banqueting house of Whitehall Palace	Inigo Jones (refaced by Sir John Soane; altered by James Wyatt)	1619–25	1 Dec 1987	TQ3016680069; 51°30′16″N 0°07′33″W	1357353	Banqueting House More images
10 Downing Street	Downing Street SW1	Large terraced town house	Office of Works (Kent, I. Ware and H. Flitcroft probably all involved); K. Couse (street front); R. Erith and Q. Terry (20th-century reconstruction and interiors)	c. 1677 (older house incorporated into Downing's development of 1682); alterations 1723–35; street front replaced c. 1766–75; reconstructed 1960–4; Terry's work 1988–90	14 Jan 1970	TQ3005979937; 51°30′12″N 0°07′39″W	1210759	10 Downing Street More images
11 Downing Street	Downing Street SW1	Terraced town house	Kenton Couse (street front); Raymond Erith (reconstruction)	1682; altered c. 1723–5, refaced c. 1766–75, altered again early 19th century, reconstructed 1960–4	14 Jan 1970	TQ3003579935; 51°30′12″N 0°07′40″W	1356989	11 Downing Street More images
The Admiralty and the Admiralty Screen	Whitehall SW1	Government offices	Thomas Ripley; screen by Robert Adam	1723–6; screen 1759–61	5 Feb 1970	TQ3003880202; 51°30′21″N 0°07′40″W	1066099	The Admiralty and the Admiralty Screen More images
Horse Guards	Whitehall SW1	Former army offices, now a museum	William Kent	c. 1745–8	5 Feb 1970	TQ3007480089; 51°30′17″N 0°07′38″W	1066100	Horse Guards More images
Forecourt railings, gates and guardhouses to Horse Guards	Whitehall SW1	Railings, gates and guardshouses	—	c. 1750–60	5 Feb 1970	TQ3010680104; 51°30′18″N 0°07′36″W	1267077	Forecourt railings, gates and guardhouses to Horse Guards More images
Dover House (Scotland Office)	Whitehall SW1	Former mansion, now government offices	James Paine (rear) and Henry Holland (front)	1755–8; enlarged 1787	5 Feb 1970	TQ3009380028; 51°30′15″N 0°07′37″W	1066101	Dover House (Scotland Office) More images
Admiralty House	Whitehall SW1	Former official residence of the First Lord of the Admiralty	Samuel Pepys Cockerell	1786–88	5 Feb 1970	TQ3006680172; 51°30′20″N 0°07′38″W	1267114	Admiralty House More images
Foreign and Commonwealth Office	Whitehall SW1	Government offices	Sir George Gilbert Scott with Sir Matthew Digby Wyatt	1861–73	5 Feb 1970	TQ2999679871; 51°30′10″N 0°07′42″W	1066102	Foreign and Commonwealth Office More images
The Cenotaph	Parliament Street SW1	War memorial	Sir Edwin Lutyens	1919–20	5 Feb 1970	TQ3015979858; 51°30′10″N 0°07′34″W	1357354	The Cenotaph More images

== See also ==
- Grade II* listed buildings in the City of Westminster (A–Z)
- Grade II* listed buildings in the City of Westminster (1–9)
