= St James's Club =

Former gentlemen's club in London

Coordinates: 51.5051°N 0.1466°W

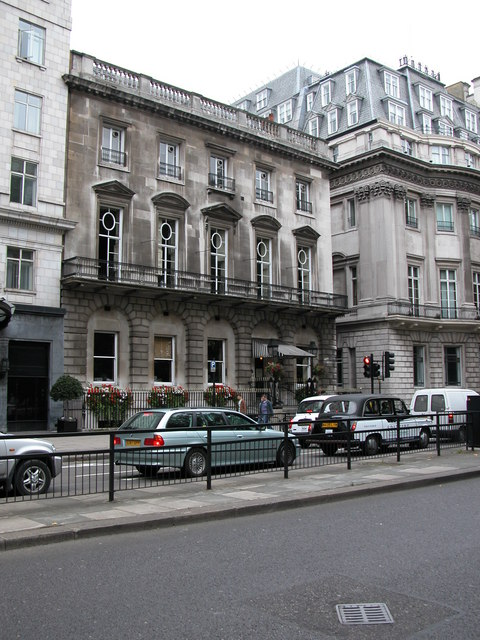
One of the club's premises, 106 Piccadilly, in 2006

The St James's Club was a London gentlemen's club which operated between 1857 and 1978. It was founded by two leading diplomats and its members continued to be largely diplomats and authors. It was first established in Bennet Street, and after a brief spell in Mayfair, moved to 106 Piccadilly by 1868. In the final quarter of the twentieth century many gentlemen's clubs of London suffered from declining membership, and in 1978 the St James's Club merged with Brooks's Club and vacated its premises.

== Foundation ==
The club was founded in 1857 by the Liberal statesman the second Earl Granville and by the Marchese d'Azeglio, Minister of Sardinia to the Court of St. James's, after a dispute at the Travellers' Club. Most members of the diplomatic corps resigned from the Travellers' and joined the new club. The club's members continued to be largely diplomats and authors, and it became the home of the Dilettanti Society.

According to the Encyclopædia Britannica article Club, in 1902, the club was the smallest London gentlemen's club in terms of numbers -

The number of members included in a London club varies from 2200 in the Army and Navy to 475 in the St James's club.

== Premises ==
The St James's Club was first established in Bennet Street, just off the north corner of St. James's Street. By 1868, it had moved into its clubhouse at 106 Piccadilly which had previously been Coventry House, the London residence of the Earls of Coventry since it had been bought by George Coventry, 6th Earl of Coventry from Sir Hugh Hunlocke in 1764, for 10,000 guineas. Coventry House had been built in 1761 on the site of an old public house called 'The Greyhound Inn'. The five-bay structure is neo-Palladian in style, with alternating pediments on the grand floor windows, over a rusticated ground floor. The Palladian window on the side façade lights a handsome staircase. There are ceilings by Robert Adam in rooms on the piano nobile. Thomas Cundy the Elder effected some remodelling, probably in 1810–11.

According to Charles Dickens, Jr., writing in 1879:

St James's Club, 106, Piccadilly, W.—Ordinary members of this club are elected by ballot, but members of the corps diplomatique, of the English diplomatic service, and of the diplomatic establishment of the Foreign Office, may be admitted without ballot, under certain restrictions. The entrance fee is £26 5s.; the subscription £11 11s.; and carefully considered reductions are made in the case of members of the English diplomatic service who are employed abroad. The election is by ballot in committee; "six shall be a quorum, one black ball in nine, if repeated, and two above nine, shall exclude." The club occupies the premises once tenanted by the defunct Coventry House Club, also known as the Coventry Club, which had opened on 1 June 1846 and closed on 25 March 1854.

During the Second World War, the club was briefly the home of Ian Fleming, the creator of James Bond.

The club was described by Charles Graves, writing of London clubs in Leather Armchairs (1963), as "the only one in London, or possibly anywhere else in the world, which has a separate room – and a large one at that – devoted solely to backgammon".

The club was also well known as a London venue for chess matches.

== Demise ==
In the decades after the Second World War, the popularity of gentlemen's clubs of London gradually fell into decline. Facing financial problems, the club merged with Brooks's Club in 1978 and vacated its premises.

=== Fate of the building ===
The grand former club house at 106 Piccadilly later became the headquarters of The International House network of language schools, founded by John Haycraft. Since October 2007, it has been the London campus of Limkokwing University of Creative Technology, a private intercontinental university based in Malaysia. From September 2017, it will be home to Eaton Square Upper School.

=== Namesakes ===
The St James's Club and Hotel, opened in 2008 in Park Place, has been marketed to evoke the historic club, but has no connection. A St James's Club in Manchester also has no connection.

== Notable members ==
- Granville Leveson-Gower, 2nd Earl Granville (1815–1891), Liberal statesman
- Vittorio Emanuelle Taparelli, Marchese d'Azeglio (1816–1890), Minister of Sardinia
- Sir Osbert Sitwell, 5th Baronet (1892–1969), author
- Sir Sacheverell Sitwell, 6th Baronet (1897–1988), author and brother of Sir Osbert
- Oliver St John Gogarty (1878–1957), Anglo-Irish author
- Sir Harry Verney, 4th Baronet MP (1881–1974), politician
- Victor Hay, 21st Earl of Erroll (1870–1928), diplomat
- Sir Murdoch Macdonald (1866–1957), politician and engineer
- Alfred Clayton Cole (1854–1920) Governor of the Bank of England
- Arthur Rowley, 8th Baron Langford (1870–1953), diplomat
- Major Cav. Lawrence Edward Lotito (1921–2004), business owner, meteorologist
- Anatole de Grunwald (1910–1967), film producer
- Lord Ivor Spencer-Churchill (1898–1956), cousin of Winston Churchill
- Evelyn Waugh (1903–1966), author
- Sir Osbert Lancaster, cartoonist, stage designer and author
- Harold Soref, politician and businessman

== See also ==
- List of London's gentlemen's clubs
