= Brooks's =

Gentlemen's club in London, England

- Formation: 1764; 262 years ago
- Type: Gentlemen's club
- Headquarters: 60 St James's Street
- Location: London, England
- Coordinates: 51°30′24″N 0°8′23″W
- Club secretary: Ian Faul
- Website: brooksclub.org

Brooks's is a gentlemen's club in St James's Street, London. It is one of the oldest and most exclusive gentlemen's clubs in the world.

== History ==
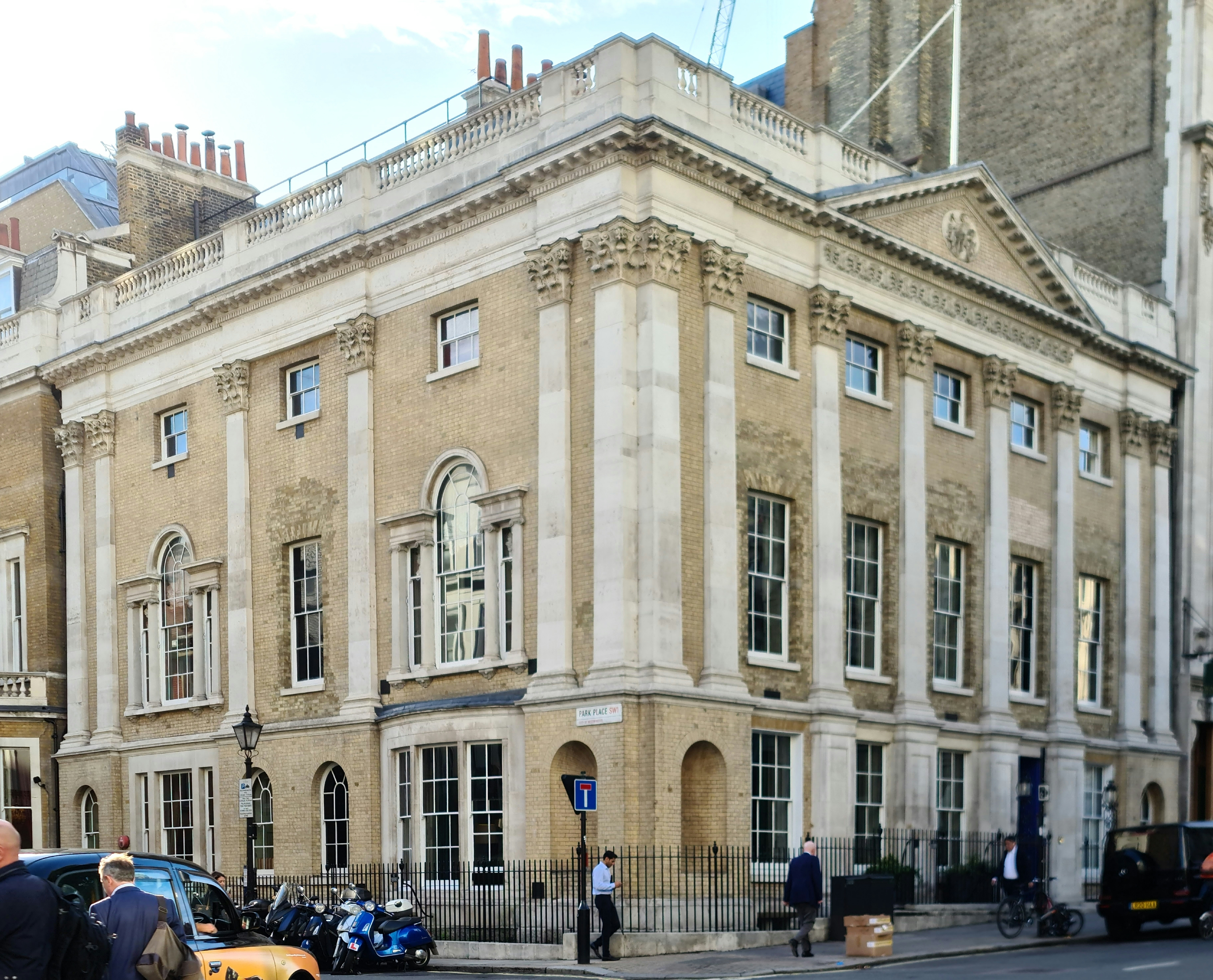
The clubhouse at 60 St James's Street, designed by Henry Holland

In January 1762, a private society was established at 50 Pall Mall by Messrs. Boothby and James in response to having been blackballed for membership of White's. This society then split to form the predecessors of both Brooks's and Boodle's. The club that was to become Brooks's was founded in March 1764 by twenty-seven prominent Whig nobles including the Duke of Portland, the Duke of Roxburghe, Lord Crewe and Lord Strathmore. Charles James Fox was elected as a member the following year at the age of sixteen. The club premises at 49 Pall Mall was a former tavern owned by William Almack as was the neighbouring 50 Pall Mall where the society had previously met and so the club become simply known as Almack's. These fashionable young men, known as Macaronis, would frequent the premises for the purposes of wining, dining and gambling.

In September 1777 William Brooks, a wine merchant and money lender who acted as Master, or manager, for Almack's, commissioned Henry Holland to design and construct a purpose-built clubhouse at a site on neighbouring St James's Street. Paid for at Brooks's own expense, the building was completed in October 1778 and all existing members of Almack's were invited to join. Brooks's gamble paid off as all existing members swiftly moved into the new building and the club then took on Brooks's name as its own. Brooks himself however would not live long to enjoy this success, dying in poverty in 1782.

The new clubhouse was built of yellow brick and Portland stone in a Palladian style similar to Holland's early country houses. The main suite of rooms on the first floor consisted of the Great Subscription Room, Small Drawing Room and the Card Room. The interiors are in neoclassical style, the Great Subscription Room having a segmental barrel vault ceiling. The interior of the building remained fairly unchanged until 1889 when neighbouring 2 Park Place, which had been purchased a few years before, was converted and adapted as part of Brooks's.

The main historic attraction of Brooks's was its gambling rooms. At several tables in one, members would stake fortunes on whist and hazard. Gambling all night was common. When the stakes far exceeded any ordinary expenses, all the club accounts were commonly deducted from winnings, so that no bills were rendered to members. Numerous eccentric bets were and are made in the Brooks's betting book. One extraordinary entry from 1785 is "Ld. Cholmondeley has given two guineas to Ld. Derby, to receive 500 Gs whenever his lordship fucks a woman in a balloon one thousand yards [900 m] from the Earth." The first hot air balloon flight had taken place just two years earlier in 1783.

In 1978, the St James's Club amalgamated with Brooks's, adding to its membership some European royalty, members of the British diplomatic corps and writers. The portrait collection of Sir Francis Dashwood's infamous Dilettanti Society is housed at the Club and there is also an historic association with the infamous society of 18th-century rake hells, the Hellfire Club.

== Notable former members ==
=== Born in the 18th century ===
- David Garrick (1717–1779)
- George Selwyn (1719–1791)
- Joshua Reynolds (1723–1792)
- Edmund Burke (1729–1797)
- John Bowes, 9th Earl of Strathmore and Kinghorne (1737–1776)
- Edward Gibbon (1737–1794)
- William Cavendish-Bentinck, 3rd Duke of Portland (1738–1809)
- Philip Francis (1740–1818)
- John Ker, 3rd Duke of Roxburghe (1740–1804)
- John Crewe, 1st Baron Crewe (1742–1829)
- John FitzPatrick, 2nd Earl of Upper Ossory (1745–1818)
- William Cavendish, 5th Duke of Devonshire (1748–1811)
- Dudley Long North (1748–1829)
- Charles James Fox (1749–1806)
- William Windham (1750–1810)
- Richard Brinsley Sheridan (1751–1816)
- Hugh Fortescue, 1st Earl Fortescue (1753–1841)
- Thomas Grenville (1755–1846)
- Lord John Townshend (1757–1833)
- Sir Scrope Bernard-Morland, 4th baronet (1758–1830)
- William Pitt the Younger (1759–1806)
- William Wilberforce (1759–1833)
- Richard 'Conversation' Sharp (1759–1835)
- Sir John Lade (1759–1838)
- George FitzRoy, 4th Duke of Grafton (1760–1844)
- Sir Frederick Fletcher-Vane, 2nd Baronet (1760–1832)
- Pascoe Grenfell (1761–1838)
- The Prince of Wales, later George IV (1762–1830)
- Prince Frederick, Duke of York and Albany (1763–1827)
- Prince William, Duke of Clarence, later William IV (1765–1837)
- William Henry Fremantle (1766–1850)
- Lord William Russell (1767–1840)
- Jean-Lambert Tallien (1767–1820)
- John Campbell, 1st Baron Cawdor (1768–1821)
- Francis Burdett (1770–1844)
- David Ricardo (1772–1823)
- Charles Williams-Wynn (1775–1850)
- Alexander Raphael (1775/6–1850)
- Richard Temple-Grenville, 1st Duke of Buckingham and Chandos (1776–1839)
- Henry Brougham, 1st Baron Brougham and Vaux (1778–1868)
- Beau Brummell (1778–1840)
- John Campbell, 1st Baron Campbell (1779–1861)
- William Lamb, 2nd Viscount Melbourne (1779–1848)
- Thomas Moore (1779–1852)
- James Evan Baillie (1781–1863)
- Edward Ellice, the Elder (1781–1863)
- John Ward, 1st Earl of Dudley (1781–1833)
- Granville Proby, 3rd Earl of Carysfort (1782–1868)
- Hugh Fortescue, 2nd Earl Fortescue (1783–1861)
- Albany Savile (c. 1783–1831)
- Henry Temple, 3rd Viscount Palmerston (1784–1865)
- Daniel O'Connell (1785–1847)
- George Parkyns, 2nd Baron Rancliffe (1785–1850)
- Thomas Francis Kennedy (1788–1879)
- William Arden, 2nd Baron Alvanley (1789–1849)
- George Nugent-Grenville, 2nd Baron Nugent (1789–1850)
- Robert Rolfe, 1st Baron Cranworth (1790–1868)
- Charles Compton Cavendish, 1st Baron Chesham (1793–1863)
- George Glyn, 1st Baron Wolverton (1797–1873)
- David Salomons (1797–1873)
- John Townshend, 4th Marquess Townshend (1798–1863)
- Matthew Talbot Baines (1799–1860)
- Michael Thomas Bass, Jr. (1799–1884)
- George Keppel, 6th Earl of Albemarle (1799–1891)
- Edward Smith-Stanley, 14th Earl of Derby (1799–1869)

=== Born in the 19th century ===
- Richard Bethell, 1st Baron Westbury (1800–1873)
- Robert Vernon, 1st Baron Lyveden (1800–1873)
- Fox Maule-Ramsay, 11th Earl of Dalhousie (1801–1874)
- Robert Grosvenor, 1st Baron Ebury (1801–1893)
- Horatio Ross (1801–1886)
- Charles Pelham Villiers (1802–1898)
- Edward Stanley, 2nd Baron Stanley of Alderley (1802–1869)
- Edward Bulwer-Lytton, 1st Baron Lytton (1803–1873)
- Edward Horsman (1807–1876)
- Lionel de Rothschild (1808–1879)
- William Cowper-Temple, 1st Baron Mount Temple (1811–1898)
- Sir Edward Buxton, 2nd Baronet (1812–1858)
- Adam Haldane-Duncan, 2nd Earl of Camperdown (1812–1867)
- William Elliot-Murray-Kynynmound, 3rd Earl of Minto (1814–1891)
- Charles Ponsonby, 2nd Baron de Mauley (1815–1896)
- Sir John Pender (1816–1896)
- Edward Pleydell-Bouverie (1818–1889)
- John Dalrymple, 10th Earl of Stair (1819–1903)
- Henry Vivian, 1st Baron Swansea (1821–1894)
- George Hay, Earl of Gifford (1822–1862)
- Sir Robert Peel, 3rd Baronet (1822–1895)
- Chichester Parkinson-Fortescue, 1st Baron Carlingford (1823–1898)
- George Glyn, 2nd Baron Wolverton (1824–1887)
- Valentine Browne, 4th Earl of Kenmare (1825–1905)
- Thomas Brooks, 1st Baron Crawshaw (1825–1908)
- Hugh Grosvenor, 1st Duke of Westminster (1825–1899)
- Anthony Henley, 3rd Baron Henley (1825–1898)
- John Wodehouse, 1st Earl of Kimberley (1826–1902)
- Thomas Baring, 1st Earl of Northbrook (1826–1904)
- Frederick Hamilton-Temple-Blackwood, 1st Marquess of Dufferin and Ava (1826–1902)
- James Carnegie, 9th Earl of Southesk (1827–1905)
- George Robinson, 1st Marquess of Ripon (1827–1909)
- Henry James, 1st Baron James of Hereford (1828–1911)
- Wentworth Beaumont, 1st Baron Allendale (1829–1907)
- Richard Boyle, 9th Earl of Cork (1829–1904)
- Edward Knatchbull-Hugessen, 1st Baron Brabourne (1829–1893)
- Henry Portman, 2nd Viscount Portman (1829–1919)
- John St Aubyn, 1st Baron St Levan (1829–1908)
- George Byng, 3rd Earl of Strafford (1830–1898)
- Francis Foljambe (1830–1917)
- George Goschen, 1st Viscount Goschen (1831–1907)
- Algernon West (1832–1921)
- Spencer Cavendish, 8th Duke of Devonshire (1833–1908)
- John Dalberg-Acton, 1st Baron Acton (1834–1902)
- Michael Biddulph, 1st Baron Biddulph (1834–1923)
- Charles Anderson-Pelham, 3rd Earl of Yarborough (1835–1875)
- Sir Robert William Duff, GCMG, PC (1835–1895)
- William Edwardes, 4th Baron Kensington (1835–1906)
- John William Mellor (1835–1911)
- John Spencer, 5th Earl Spencer (1835–1910)
- Edmond Wodehouse (1835–1914)
- The Hon. Evelyn Ashley (1836–1907)
- Thomas Brassey, 1st Earl Brassey (1836–1918)
- Michael Bass, 1st Baron Burton (1837–1909)
- Richard Grosvenor, 1st Baron Stalbridge (1837–1912)
- Farrer Herschell, 1st Baron Herschell (1837–1899)
- Sir George Trevelyan, 2nd Baronet (1838–1928)
- Arthur Gore, 5th Earl of Arran (1839–1901)
- Montague Guest (1839–1909)
- Charles Hanbury-Tracy, 4th Baron Sudeley (1840–1922)
- Edward Heneage, 1st Baron Heneage (1840–1922)
- Henry Strutt, 2nd Baron Belper (1840–1914)
- Archibald Acheson, 4th Earl of Gosford (1841–1922)
- Robert Haldane-Duncan, 3rd Earl of Camperdown (1841–1918)
- Hamar Alfred Bass (1842–1898)
- Robert Finlay, 1st Viscount Finlay (1842–1929)
- Henry Petty-Fitzmaurice, 5th Marquess of Lansdowne (1845–1927)
- Charles Cecil Cotes (1846–1898)
- Herbert Gardner, 1st Baron Burghclere (1846–1921)
- John Lawrence, 2nd Baron Lawrence (1846–1913)
- Edward Walter Hamilton (1847–1908)
- Archibald Primrose, 5th Earl of Rosebery (1847–1929)
- Victor Bruce, 9th Earl of Elgin (1849–1917)
- Edward Marjoribanks, 2nd Baron Tweedmouth (1849–1909)
- Sir John Simeon, 4th Baronet (1850–1909)
- Albert Grey, 4th Earl Grey (1851–1917)
- Edward Ponsonby, 8th Earl of Bessborough (1851–1920)
- Cromartie Sutherland-Leveson-Gower, 4th Duke of Sutherland (1851–1913)
- Thomas Lister, 4th Baron Ribblesdale (1854–1925)
- George Venables-Vernon, 7th Baron Vernon (1854–1928)
- William Mansfield, 1st Viscount Sandhurst (1855–1921)
- Richard Haldane, 1st Viscount Haldane (1856–1928)
- Francis Stonor, 4th Baron Camoys (1856–1897)
- Robert Crewe-Milnes, 1st Marquess of Crewe (1858–1945)
- Herbrand Russell, 11th Duke of Bedford (1858–1940)
- Sir Charles Seely, 2nd Baronet (1859–1926)
- Wentworth Beaumont, 1st Viscount Allendale (1860–1923)
- The Hon. Hubert Beaumont (1864–1922)
- Sir John Fuller, 1st Baronet (1864–1913)
- Freeman Freeman-Thomas, 1st Marquess of Willingdon (1866–1941)
- Wilfrid Ashley, 1st Baron Mount Temple (1867–1939)
- Victor Cavendish, 9th Duke of Devonshire (1868–1938)
- Oliver Russell, 2nd Baron Ampthill (1869–1935)
- Christopher Vane, 10th Baron Barnard, CMG, OBE, MC, TD (1888–1964)

=== Born in the 20th century ===
- James Lees-Milne (1908–1997)
- Sir Isaiah Berlin, OM (1909–1997)
- Sir Patrick Dean, GCMG (1909–1994)
- Vane Ivanovic (1913–1999)
- Patrick O'Brian CBE (1914–2000), author of the Aubrey-Maturin novels
- Gordon Richardson, Baron Richardson of Duntisbourne, KG, MBE, TD, PC, DL (1915–2010)
- John Desmond Cronin (1916–1986)
- Charles Denman, 5th Baron Denman, MC (1916–2012)
- Sir Nigel Strutt, TD, DL (1916–2004)
- George Jellicoe, 2nd Earl Jellicoe, KBE, DSO, MC, PC, FRS (1918–2007)
- Sir Alan Campbell (1919–2007)
- Henry Kitchener, 3rd Earl Kitchener, TD, DL (1919–2011)
- Andrew Cavendish, 11th Duke of Devonshire (1920–2004)
- Roy Jenkins, Baron Jenkins of Hillhead (1920–2003)
- John Colvin (1922–2003)
- Sir Oliver Millar (1923–2007)
- Christopher James, 5th Baron Northbourne, DL (1926–2019)
- Alan Clark (1928–1999)
- Sir Richard Paniguian (1949–2017)
- Sir Gavyn Arthur, Lord Mayor of London (1951–2016)
- Tom Holland, historian (born 1968)

== See also ==
- The Club (dining club), a dining club, which dines at Brooks's
- List of London's gentlemen's clubs

== Sources ==
- Edward Walford; Old and New London: Volume 4, pp. 140–164; 1878
- F. H. W. Sheppard, ed.; Survey of London: volumes 29 and 30: St James Westminster, Part 1, pp. 325–338; 1960
- Christopher Hibbert; London, the Biography of a City; 1969; William Morrow, New York
- Robert Phipps Dod; Parliamentary Companion (various editions)
