= Statue of George III, Somerset House =

Sculpture in London by John Bacon

Coordinates: 51.51133°N 0.11742°W

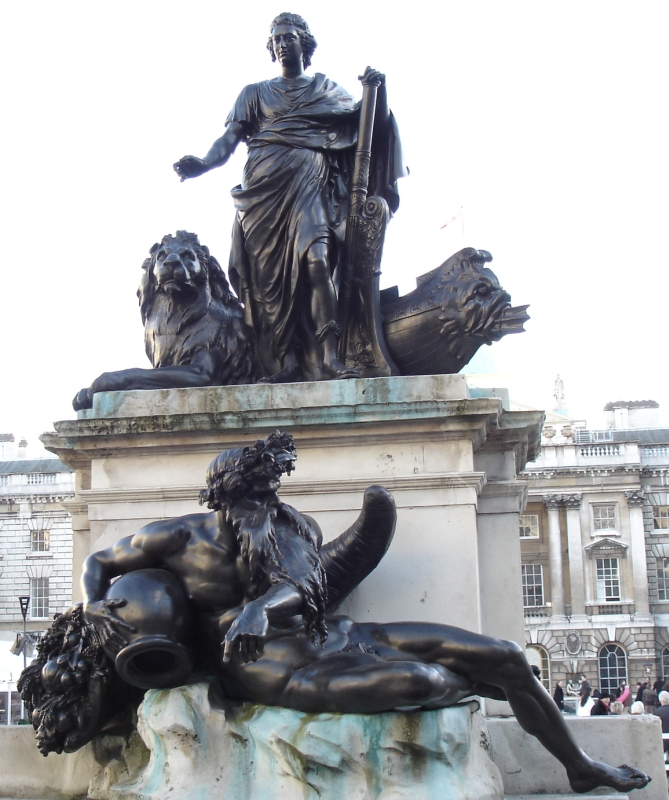
The statue in April 2010

The statue of George III, Somerset House, formally titled George III and the River Thames, is a Grade I listed outdoor bronze sculptural group depicting King George III and Neptune or Father Thames, located in the quadrangle of Somerset House, London, England. The sculptor was John Bacon, and the statue was erected between 1778 and 1789. (Note: The dating of the work varies. The 1841 Dictionary of dates, and universal reference gives 1788, while Historic England and a 1910 survey by the London County Council state 1780. The Oxford Dictionary of National Biography entry for the sculptor, John Bacon, mentions commissions he received in 1788 and dates this sculpture to the 'same period'. Margaret Whinney in Sculpture in Britain, 1530–1830 dates the 'design' of this and other works to 1778–1789.)

George III is dressed in Roman apparel, leaning on a rudder, flanked by the prow of a Roman boat and a lion. Father Thames is reclining on a lower, semi-circular plinth, one hand on an urn with a cornucopia behind him.

When Queen Charlotte first saw the statue of her husband she asked the sculptor 'Why did you make so frightful a figure?'. Bacon bowed and replied 'Art cannot always affect what is ever within the reach of Nature – the union of beauty and majesty.'
