= Sussex Place =

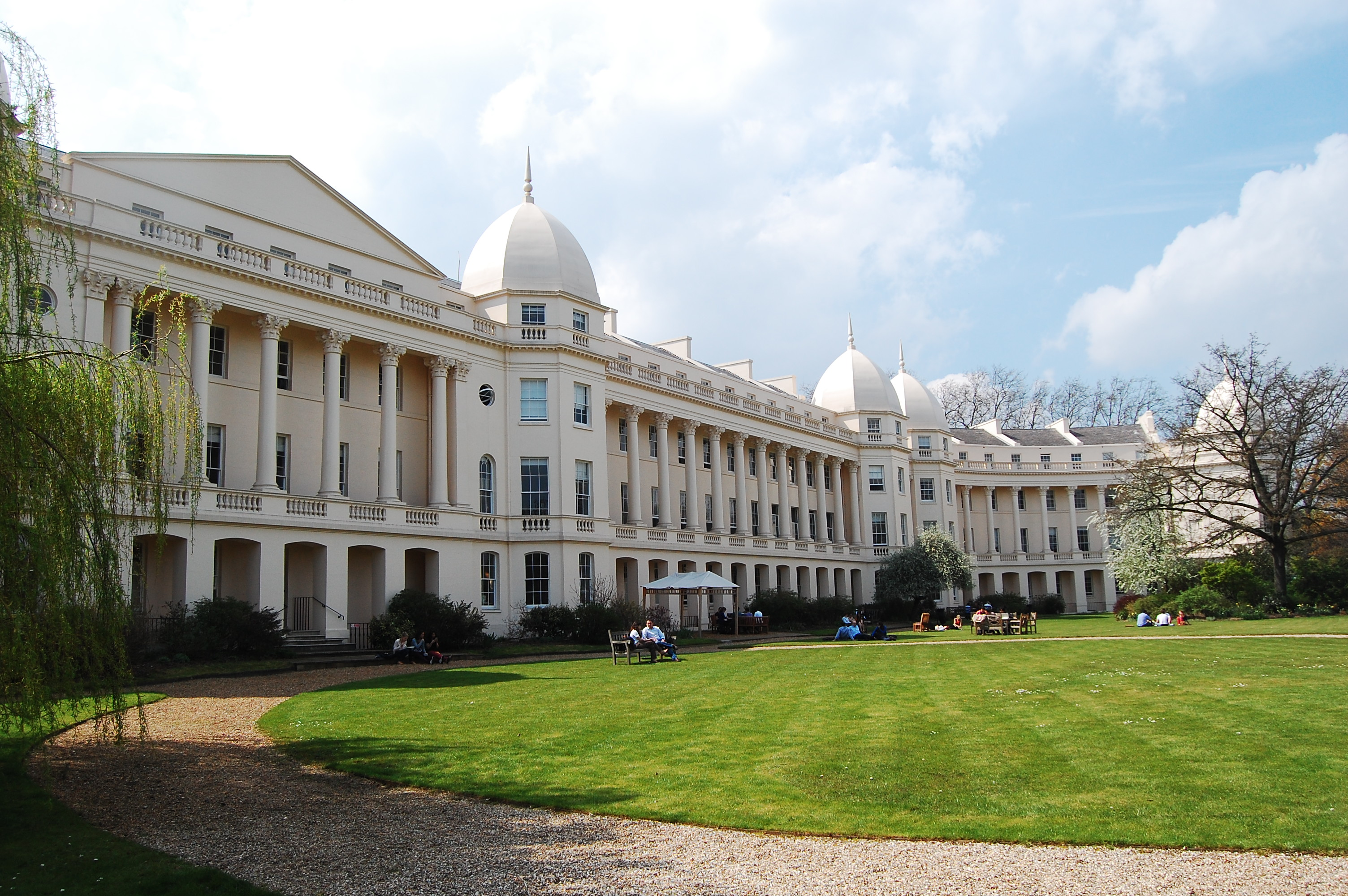
- Sussex Place

- Shown in Westminster
- 51.5262°N 0.1609°W
- Location: Regent's Park

History
- Built: 1823

Site notes
- Architect: John Nash

Listed Building – Grade I
- Designated: 5 February 1970
- Reference no.: 1264092

Sussex Place is a residential facility in Regent's Park, London. It is the home of the London Business School. It is a Grade I listed building.

== History ==
The building was designed by John Nash and built by William Smith, being completed in 1823. The building, which features ten pointed cupolas along the roof line and a façade adorned with Corinthian columns, was originally built as 26 terraced houses. William Crockford, the proprietor of the St James's Club in St James's Street, lived at No. 26 in the 1840s.

It was acquired by the London Business School and converted for educational use in the late 1960s.

The Royal College of Obstetricians and Gynaecologists had its headquarters from 1960 to 2019 at 27 Sussex Place (adjacent to the London Business School main building). It sold its lease to London Business School in 2017.
