= London Park School Mayfair =

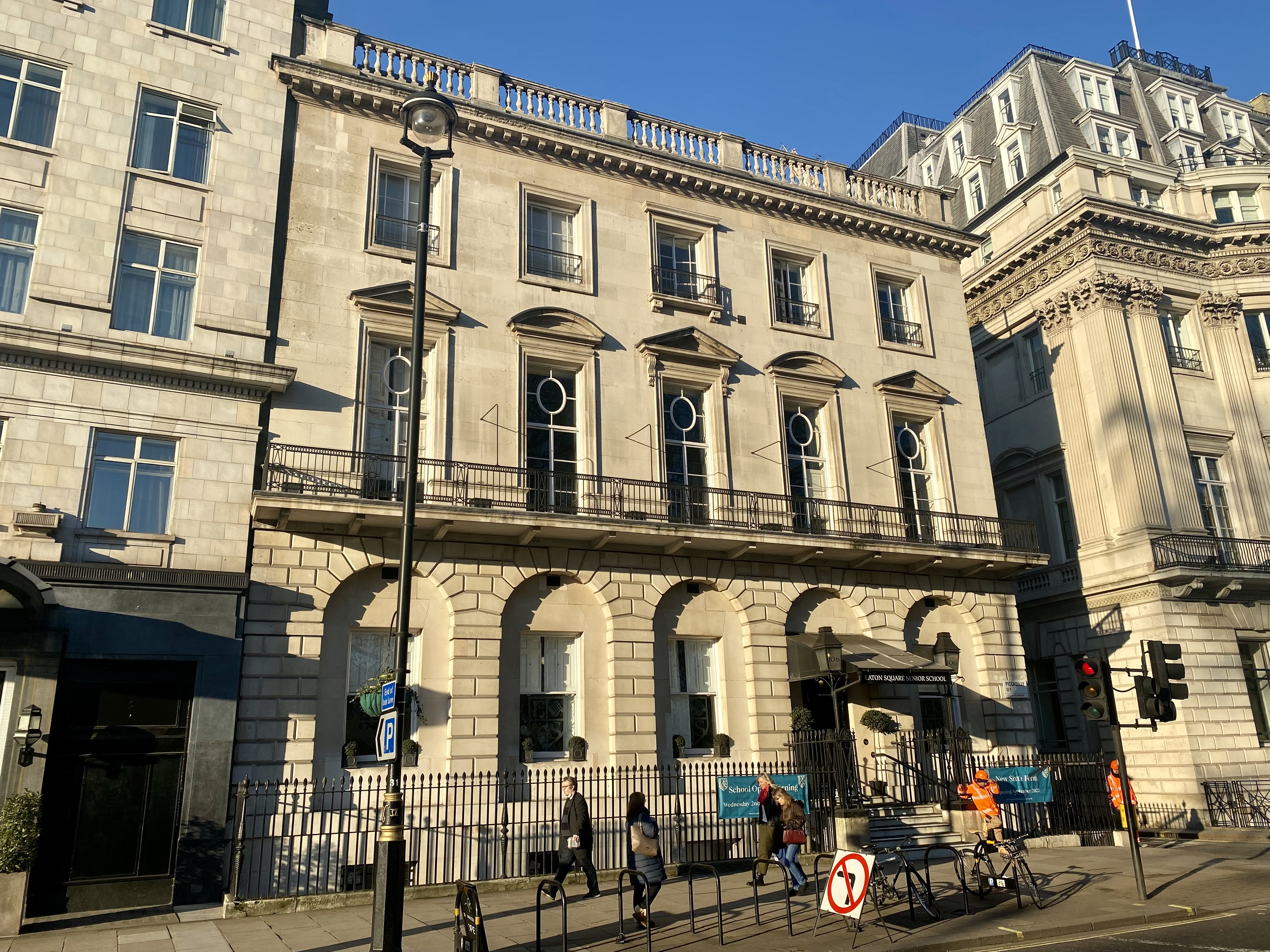
- 106 Piccadilly

Location
- 106 Piccadilly; London, W1J 7NL; United Kingdom; 51.5051°N 0.1467°W

Information
- Type: Private
- Motto: Smaller schools for bigger thinking
- Religious affiliations: All faiths and none
- Established: 2024 as LPS Mayfair (2017 as Eaton Square Senior)
- Local authority: City of Westminster
- Department for Education URN: 144795 Tables
- Principal of London Park Schools group: Mrs Suzie Longstaff; Dr Adrian Rainbow, Head of LPS Mayfair & LPS Sixth
- Gender: Co-educational
- Age: 11 to 18
- Website: www.londonparkschools.com

London Park School Mayfair (formerly Eaton Square Senior School) is a co-educational, independent day school for ages 11–16. Students move on to LPS Sixth in Belgravia, where they are joined by students from the sister school LPS Clapham and from other schools.

== London Park School Mayfair ==
London Park School Mayfair is a private co-educational secondary day school for children aged 11–16, which opened in September 2017 originally as Eaton Square Mayfair. In 2023 it joined London Park Schools, a group of intentionally smaller secondary schools in London, designed to offer a warmer, more inclusive and modern approach to education and re-branded as LPS Mayfair in September 2024. It also hosts LPS Hybrid, a four-day online and one-day in school offer. Students from both LPS Mayfair and LPS Hybrid move on seamlessly to LPS Sixth in Belgravia where they are joined by students from sibling school, LPS Clapham.

LPS Mayfair is based at 106 Piccadilly, a Grade I–listed townhouse in Mayfair opposite Green Park and a short walk from the tube station. It was built for Sir Henry Hunloke, 4th Baronet, from 1759 to 1761, perhaps by the architect Matthew Brettingham. It was later sold to George Coventry, 6th Earl of Coventry, for whom Robert Adam remodelled the first-floor rooms in 1765–1770; Adam had previously been engaged on the Earl's country house at Croome Court in Warwickshire. Further alterations were made by Thomas Cundy for the 7th Earl in 1810–1811. The Bachelor's or St James's Club occupied the building from 1868 to 1975. Famous members included Earl Kitchener, Ian Fleming, and Evelyn Waugh. The building hosts a memorial to members of the Bachelor's Club who died in the Great War.

The school is owned by Dukes Education, , one of the largest independent schools groups in the UK.
