= Statue of Queen Anne, Queen Anne's Gate =

Statue in Westminster, London, England

Coordinates: 51.500494°N 0.132942°W

Queen Anne
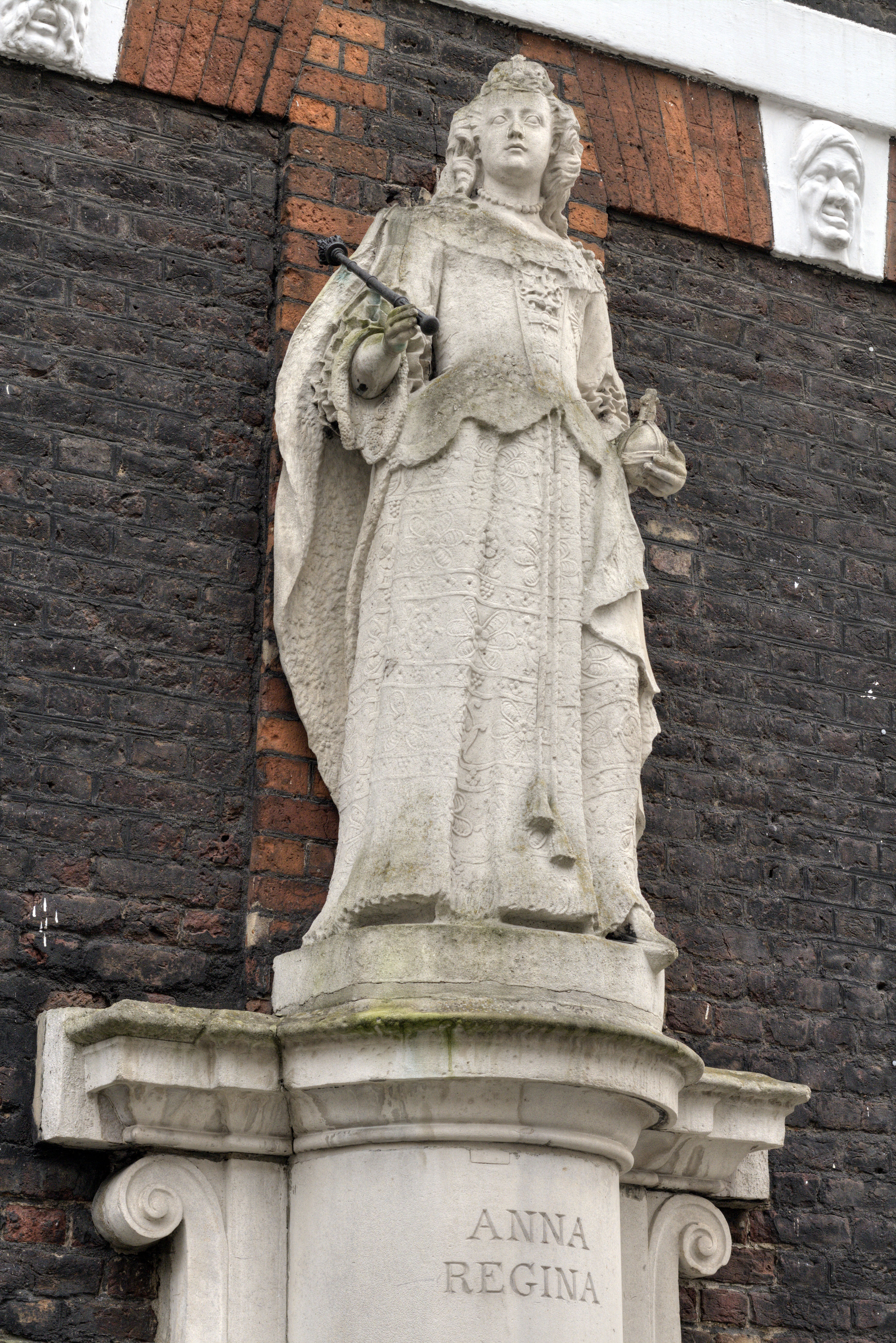
- Artist: Unknown
- Year: c. 1705; 321 years ago
- Type: Statue
- Medium: Portland stone
- Subject: Anne, Queen of Great Britain
- Dimensions: 210 cm (83 in)
- Location: Queen Anne's Gate, London SW1, United Kingdom

Listed Building – Grade I
- Official name: Statue of Queen Anne against north flank of No 15 Queen Anne's Gate
- Designated: 5 February 1970
- Reference no.: 1227294

A Grade I-listed statue of Queen Anne stands on a pedestal alongside the north wall of No. 15 Queen Anne's Gate in Westminster, London. It portrays the queen wearing a brocaded skirt and bodice and an open cloak with the insignia of the Order of the Garter; on her head is a small crown and in her hands she holds an orb and sceptre. The statue, carved from Portland stone, stands on a plinth of the same material with the inscription ANNA REGINA. The pedestal consists of a fat "engaged" cylinder with a flat volute on either side, each with scrolls adorned with carved flowers and leaves. Neither the sculptor's identity nor the exact date of the work are known, but it is probably of the early eighteenth century.

== History ==
When Queen Anne's Gate was built by the banker William Paterson in 1704–05, it originally formed two separate closes divided by a wall with two openings, with Queen Square to the west and Park Street to the east. The statue is first mentioned in Edward Hatton's A New View of London (1708) as being "erected in full proportion on a pedestal at the E.End of Q[ueen]. Square, Westminster". An engraved map of 1710 depicts the statue of Queen Anne in the middle of the wall, flanked by the gateways on either side. At some point in the early 19th century the statue was moved to a new position in the square. The Gentleman's Magazine reported in 1814 that "the statue until of late occupied a conspicuous situation on the East end of the square, but now we find it huddled up in a corner".

By 1862, the statue had lost its nose and right arm. The Earl of Caernarvon and other local residents pressed the Office of Works to repair it, saying in a letter that the residents had long been dissatisfied with the statue's poor condition. His request received a favourable response from the First Commissioner of Works, William Cowper. Although Cowper regarded the statue as being of "little merit as a work of art", he did not "think it desirable that a statue of an illustrious sovereign should be left in a public place without a nose or right arm." The sculptor John Thomas was hired to repair it. He based the face on a "squeeze" (plaster cast) of Francis Bird's statue of Queen Anne outside St Paul's Cathedral. The right arm was replaced with a marble substitute and a replacement bronze sceptre was also installed.

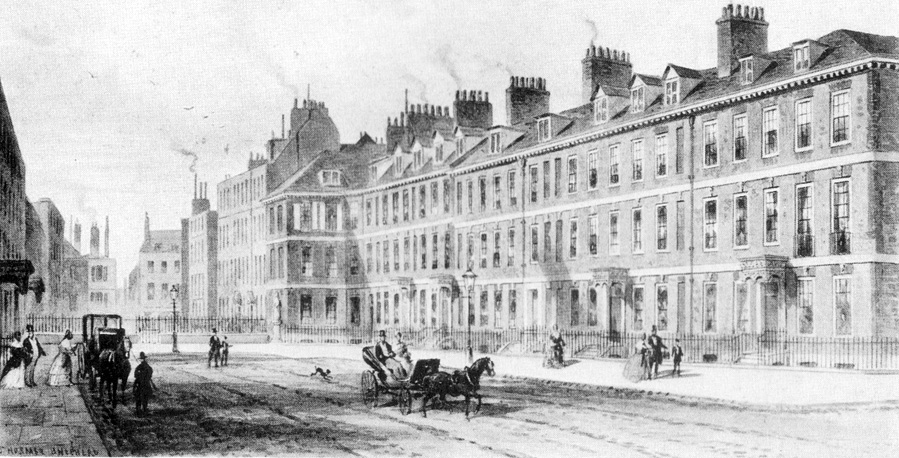
Queen Square (now Queen Anne's Gate), London, in 1850. The statue was located at the right-hand edge of the railings at the rear of the square.

The statue's poor condition was due in large part to the local children's mistaken belief that the statue represented the ill-reputed Queen Mary. They would ask "Bloody Queen Mary" to come down from her pedestal, and upon "receiving, naturally, no response, [they would] assail it with missiles". Cowper recommended in 1862 that "if the name of Queen Anne be written in legible characters on the pedestal, their puerile outrage will not be repeated." The inscription was therefore added by John Thomas as part of his restoration work. Nonetheless the vandalism continued, and it was not until a generation later that the complaints ceased. Another legend concerning the statue holds that on 1 August, the anniversary of Queen Anne's death, the statue climbs down and walks three times up and down the street.

The dividing wall between the two streets was demolished in 1873 to form the present Queen Anne's Square, and at that time the statue was removed to its present position. It became the subject of a long-running dispute over ownership, as it was not brought into the care of the Office of Works when the Public Statues Act 1854 was enacted. The owner of 15 Queen Anne's Gate permitted the Office of Works to carry out repairs in 1862 but objected to its removal and did not transfer it into public ownership.

In 1938, the house's then owner, E. Thornton Smith, carried out repairs at his own expense. He resolved the question of ongoing maintenance through his position as Master of the Worshipful Company of Gardeners by presenting the statue to the Company and arranging that it would pay for any future repairs with the Office of Works carrying out the work. An 18-inch thick brick wall was built around the statue in 1940 to protect it from enemy bombing during the Second World War; it was only in April 1947 that the wall was removed.

== See also ==
- 1705 in art
