= Cultural depictions of Mary II =

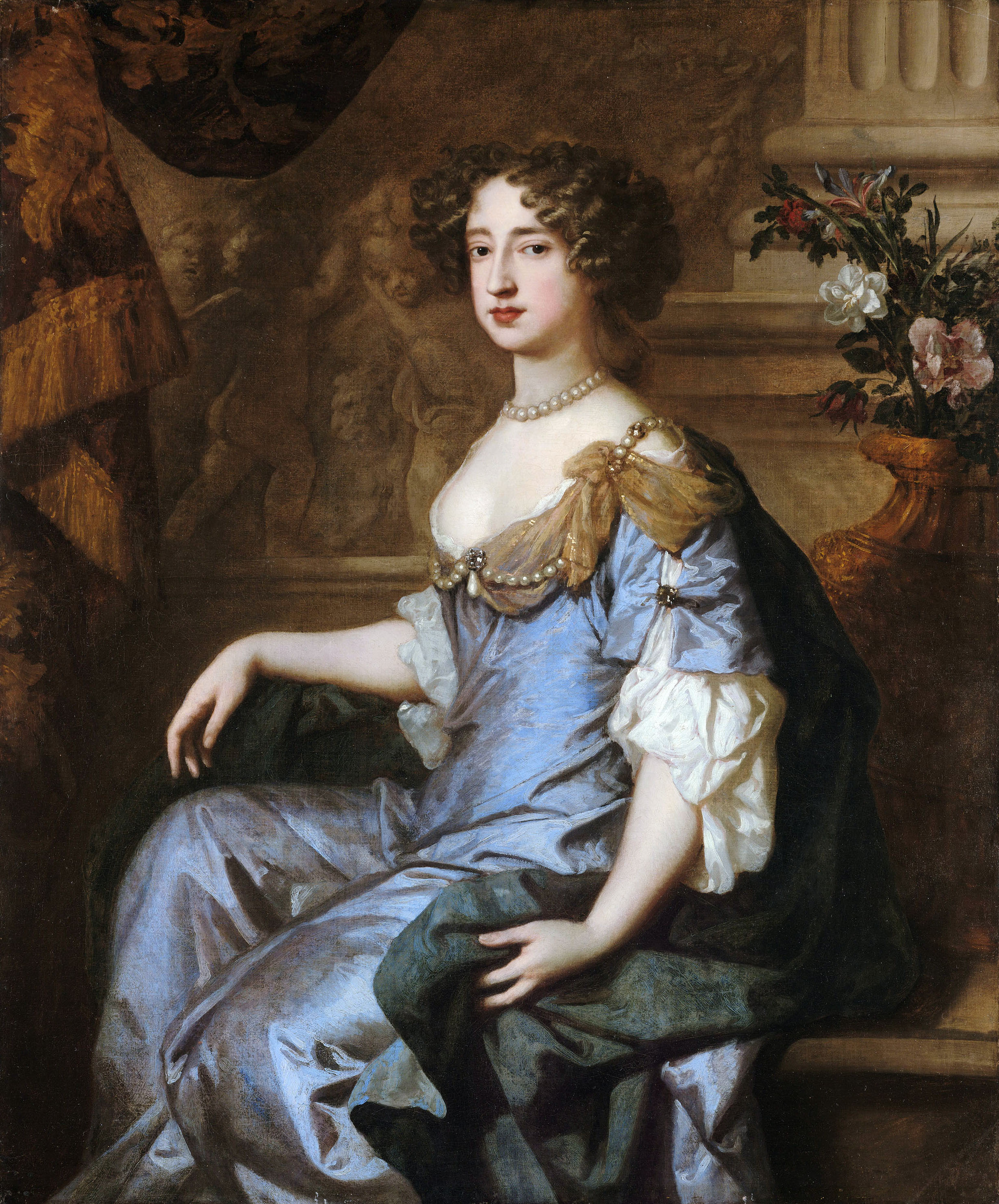

Mary II has been depicted in novels, film and television.

== Ballads ==
Copies of extant seventeenth-century broadside ballads about Mary II and William III, such as "England's Triumph" and "England's Happiness in the Crowning of William and Mary" are housed in Magdalene College's Pepys Library, the National Library of Scotland, and the British Library. She is one of the monarchs listed in later versions of "The Wandering Jew's Chronicle".

== Literature ==
Mary II appears as a character in Emma Marshall's 1894 novel Kensington Palace in the Days of Queen Mary II. She appears in Marjorie Bowen's historical novels about William III's life: I Will Maintain (1910), Defender of the Faith (1911), and God and the King (1911). She is the protagonist of Jean Plaidy's novel 1992 novel William's Wife, later republished under the title The Queen's Devotion, and appears as in Plaidy's novel 1991 novel The Pleasures of Love (republished as The Merry Monarch's Wife), which focuses on Catherine of Braganza. Mary II also appears as a character in Neal Stephenson's The Baroque Cycle novels.

== Film and television ==
Mary II is portrayed by Sarah Crowden in the 1992 film Orlando, based on the novel by Virginia Woolf. Rebecca Front appears as Mary II in 1995 film England, My England, and Victoria Wood portrays her in 2005 film The League of Gentlemen's Apocalypse. She is portrayed by Ella-June Henrard in 2015 Dutch film Michiel de Ruyter.

She is portrayed by Lisa Daniely in the 1969 BBC television serial The First Churchills. Louise Ford appeared as Mary II in series 6 and 7 of the 2015 revival of Horrible Histories.

== See also ==
- Cultural depictions of William III of England
- Cultural depictions of Anne, Queen of Great Britain
