= Cultural depictions of William III of England =

William of Orange (1650-1702)

Cultural depictions of William III reflect the lasting political and religious significance of William III of England (1650–1702) across Ireland, Britain, and beyond. William is most prominently commemorated in Northern Ireland, where his victory at the Battle of the Boyne (1690) remains a central symbol of Unionist and Loyalist identity. Depictions of William appear across a wide range of media, including broadside ballads, decorative glass, equestrian statues, murals, banners, literature, film, and television.

== Ballads ==
Copies of extant seventeenth-century broadside ballads about William III and Mary II, such as "England's Triumph", "England's Happiness in the Crowning of William and Mary", "A new loyal song, upon King William's Progress into Ireland" and "Royal Courage, King William's Happy Success in Ireland", are housed in Magdalene College's Pepys Library, the National Library of Scotland, and the British Library.

== Art ==
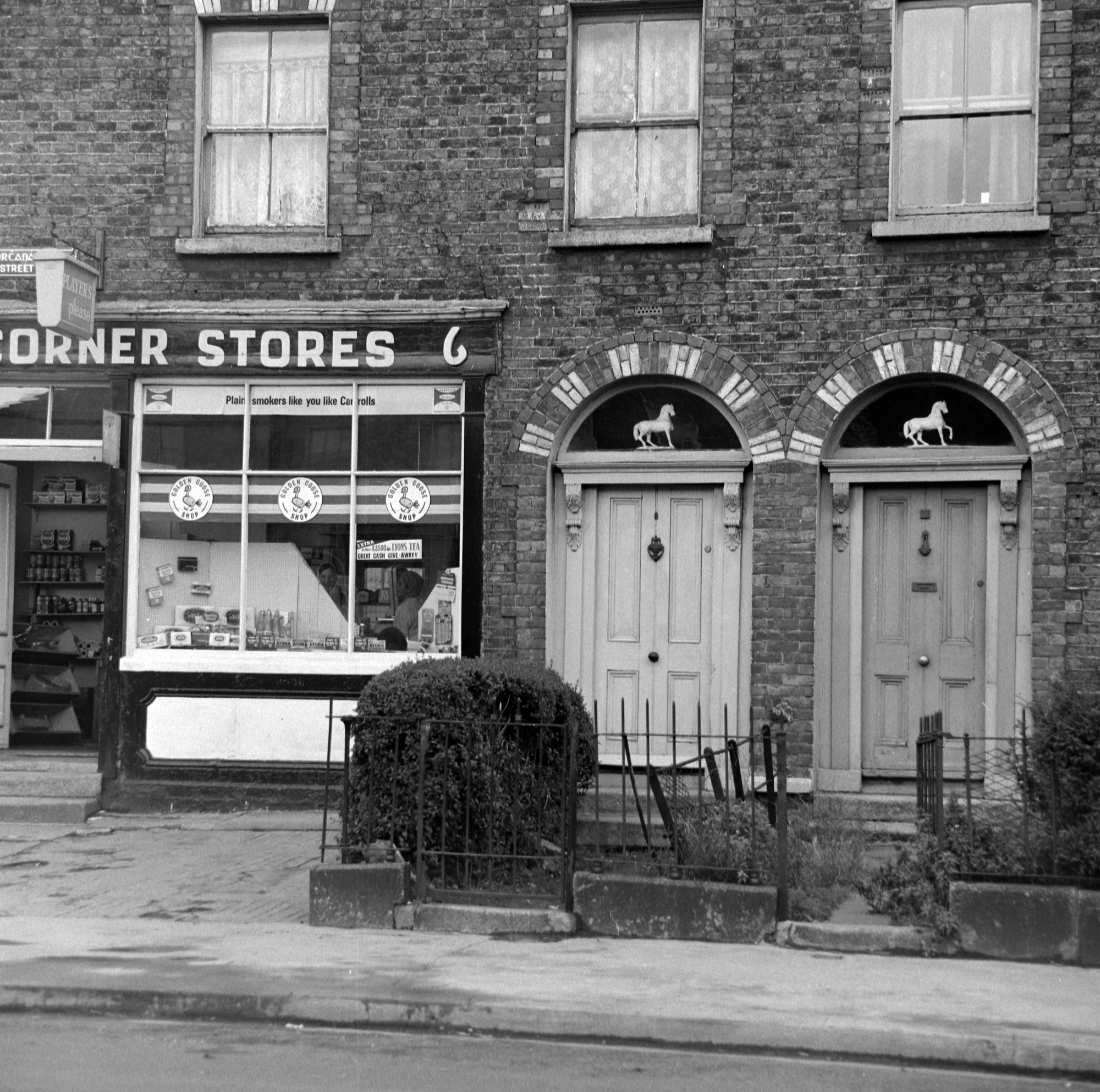
White horses on display on Upper Grand Canal Street, Dublin in 1967

In Dublin city, the display of a white plasterwork horse in the fanlight of a door was believed to denote a household that was Protestant and loyal to the United Kingdom. The horse was a depiction of William's white horse, which he rode during the Battle of the Boyne.

In the late 1700s, "Williamite glass", featuring a depiction of the King was a popular product by craftsmen in Ireland. One example held in the Ulster Museum featured the inscription "The glorious and immortal memory of King William and his Queen Mary and perpetual disappointment to the Pope, the Pretender, and all the enemies of the Protestant religion". Paintings of William, often on his horse, were common in stately homes and public buildings in Ireland in the 19th century.

=== Statues ===
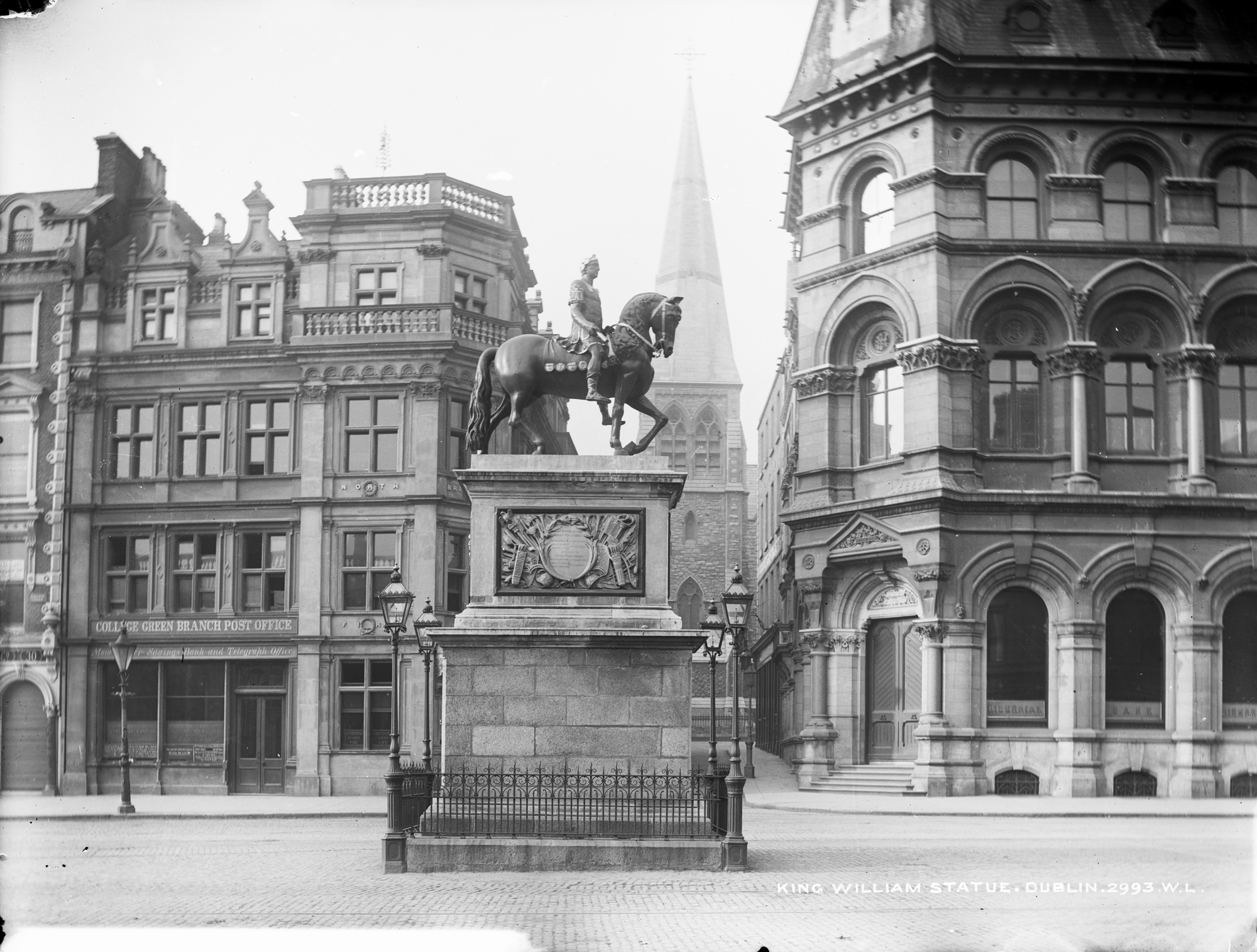
Statue of William of Orange on College Green, erected in 1701 in Dublin. In 1836, the statue was bombed, but was re-erected. It was later destroyed by another bomb in 1929.

An equestrian statue of William by Grinling Gibbons stood on College Green, Dublin, which was unveiled on 1 July 1701. It became a focal point for political protest and celebrations, with protests beginning as early as 1710 when two Trinity College students damaged and defaced the statue. During William's birthday celebrations, the statue was painted white, and decorated with an orange cloak and sash with orange streamers. In July, the statue was decorated with orange lilies. In 1836, the statue was bombed, but was re-erected. It was later destroyed by another bomb in 1929.

In London, an equestrian bronze of the King can be found in St. James's Square.

=== Murals and banners ===
In Northern Ireland, murals in Unionist or Loyalist areas of the country often depict William and his success at the Battle of the Boyne. The first mural of William was painted in Derry in the 1920s and depicted the Battle of the Boyne and his ending of the siege of Derry. King William is the most common theme of Loyalist murals in Northern Ireland. The "King Billy" murals are a mixture of "some old, some new, some ornate, some naïve". Many of the murals feature the date 1690, in relation to the Battle of the Boyne.

Banners and other depictions are also displayed and paraded during celebrations and marches marking the date of the Battle, 12 July, by Unionists. In Northern Ireland the celebrations feature Orange Order marches. His image is also featured on drums and the insignia of the Orangemen. These July celebrations have also historically taken place in parts of Scotland and Canada. Other days celebrated by Irish protestants in memory of William were his birthday on 4 November, the date of his landing in England, and his victory at the Battle of Aughrim on 1 July.

== Literature ==
Marjorie Bowen wrote three historical novels about William's life. They are I Will Maintain (1910), Defender of the Faith (1911), and God and the King (1911).

== Film ==
William III of England has been played on screen by:

- Bernard Lee in the 1937 film The Black Tulip, based on the novel by Alexandre Dumas, père
- Henry Daniell in the 1945 film Captain Kidd
- Olaf Hytten in the 1952 film Against All Flags
- Thom Hoffman in the 1992 film Orlando, based on the novel by Virginia Woolf
- Corin Redgrave in the 1995 film England, My England, the story of the composer Henry Purcell
- Bernard Hill in the 2005 film The League of Gentlemen's Apocalypse
- Egbert-Jan Weber in the 2015 film Michiel de Ruyter

== Television ==
- Alan Rowe in the 1969 BBC drama series The First Churchills.
- Laurence Olivier in the 1986 NBC TV mini-series Peter the Great.
- Jochum ten Haaf in the 2003 BBC miniseries Charles II: The Power and the Passion.
- George Webster in Versailles (2015).
- James McNicholas in the 2009 sketch show Horrible Histories.

== Theatre ==
- Carl Prekopp in the 2015 premiere of the play Queen Anne by the Royal Shakespeare Company at Stratford-upon-Avon.
