= 1841 United Kingdom general election =

- 29 June – 22 July 1841

All 658 seats in the House of Commons 330 seats needed for a majority
- Turnout: 63.5% 593,445
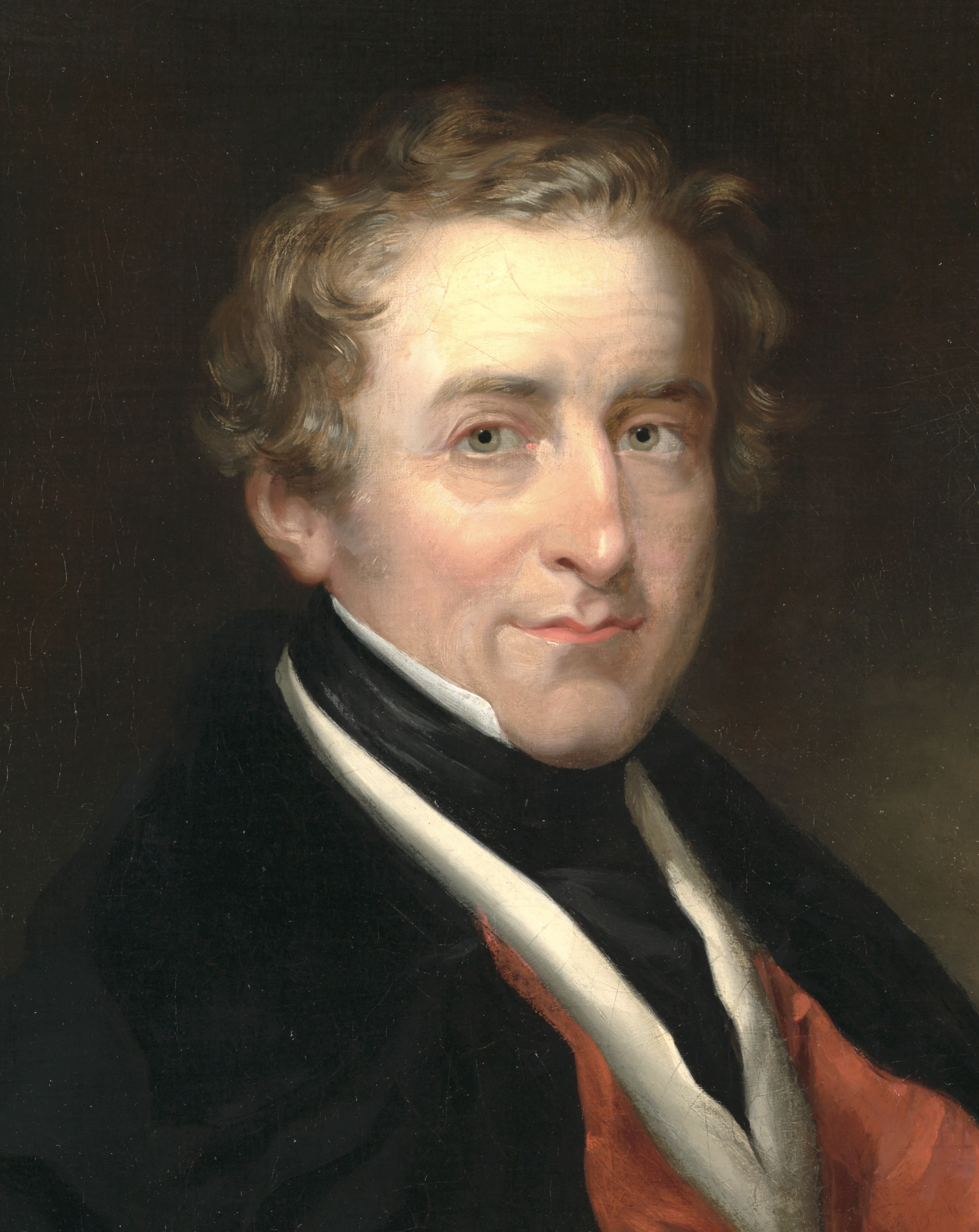

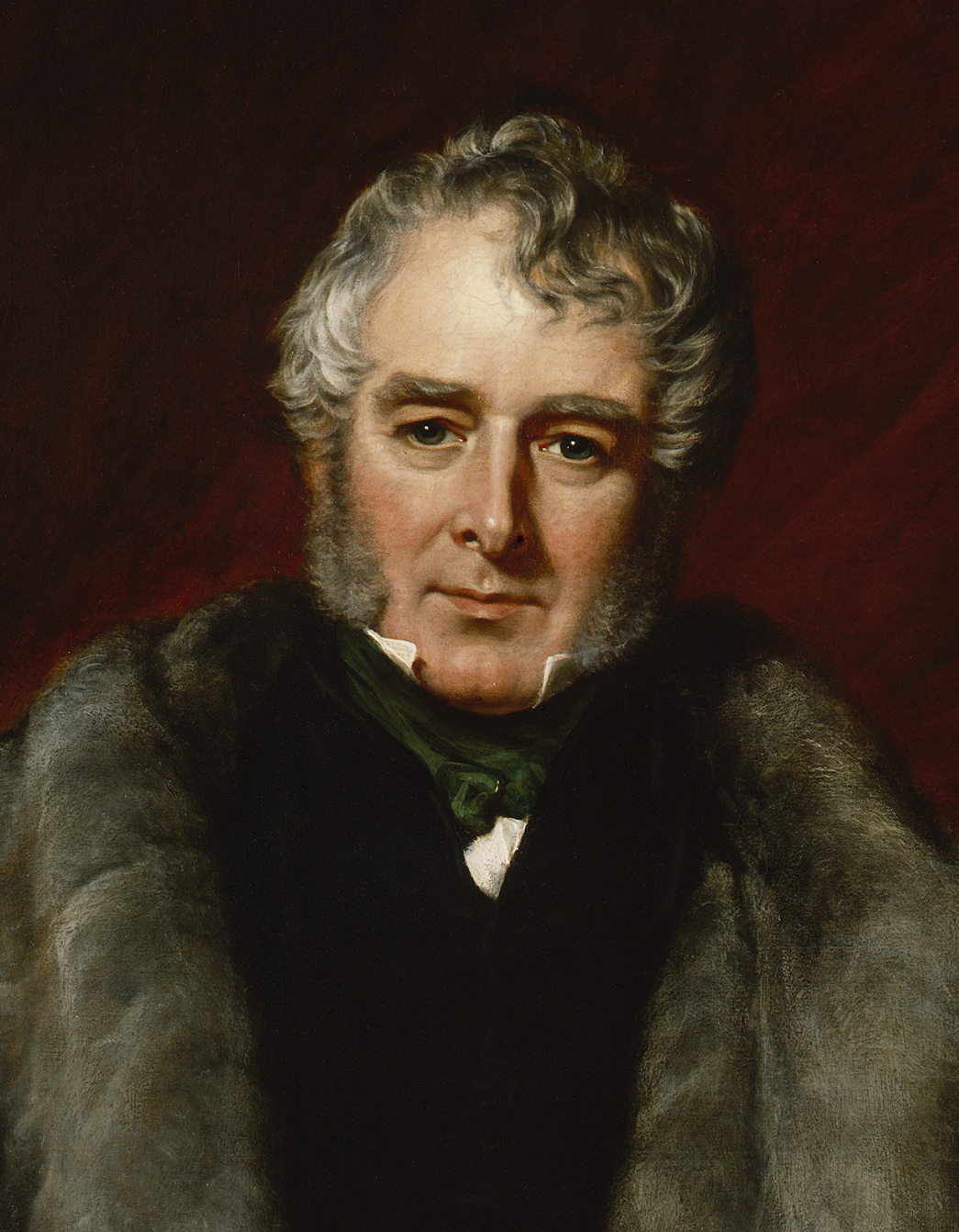

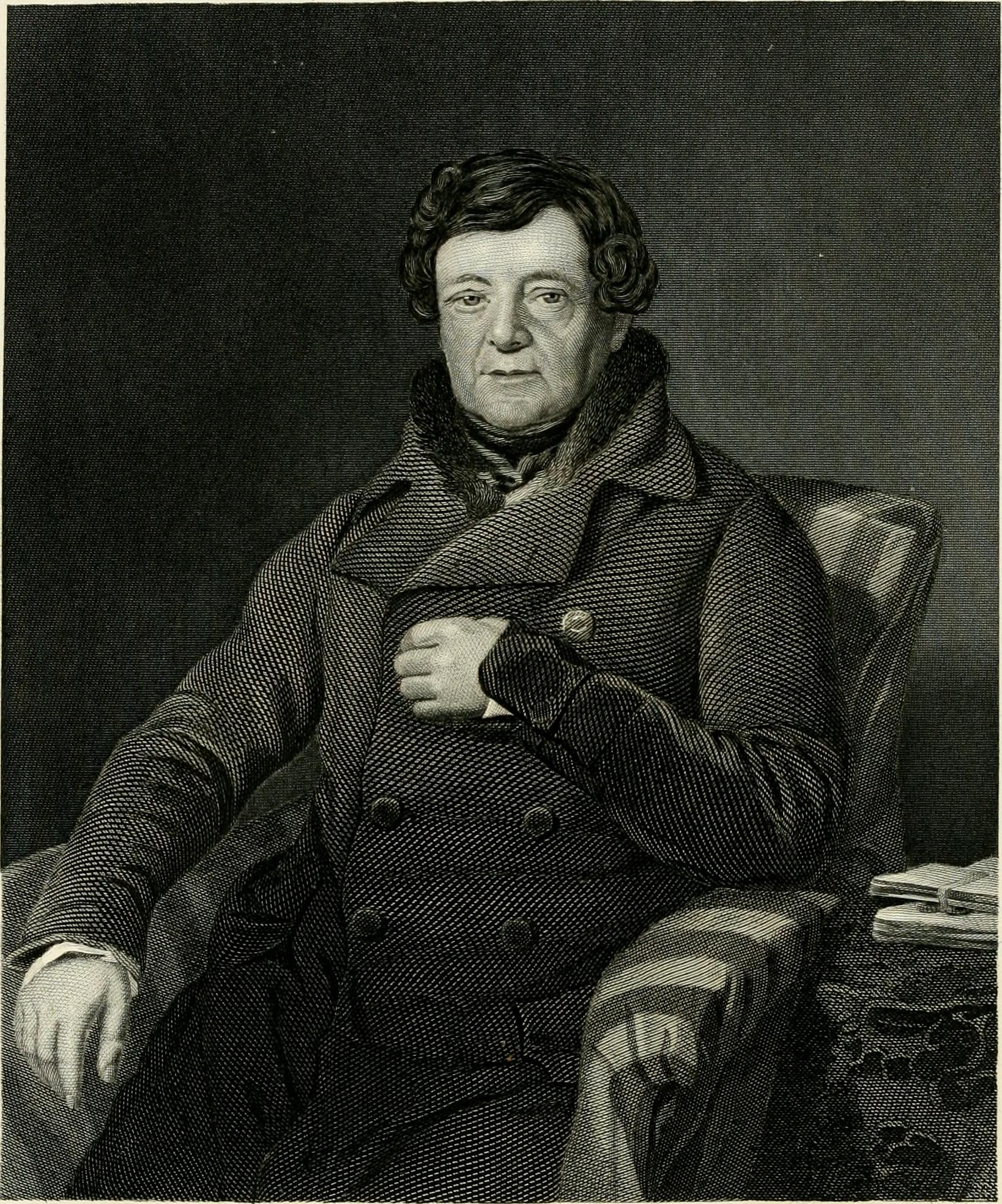
	First party	Second party	Third party
Leader	Sir Robert Peel	Viscount Melbourne	Daniel O'Connell
Party	Conservative	Whig	Irish Repeal
Leader since	19 December 1834	16 July 1834	15 April 1840
Leader's seat	Tamworth	House of Lords	Dublin City (defeated); County Cork
Last election	314 seats, 47.6%	344 seats, 52.4%	Compact with Whigs
Seats before	314	314	30
Seats won	367	271 (Note: The seat and vote count figures for the Whigs given here include the Speaker of the House of Commons)	20
Seat change	▲53	▼43	▼10
Popular vote	306,314	273,902	12,537
Percentage	51.6%	46.2%	2.1%
Swing	▲4.0 pp	▼6.2 pp	Compact with Whigs
- Colours denote the winning party

- Composition of the Commons after the election
Prime Minister before election
Viscount Melbourne
Whig
Prime Minister after election
Sir Robert Peel
Conservative

The 1841 United Kingdom general election was held between 29 June and 22 July 1841. Following increasing government defeats, the Conservatives under Sir Robert Peel won a decisive victory against the governing Whigs.

The Conservatives campaigned mainly on an 11-point programme modified from their previous electoral effort and designed by Peel, whilst the Whigs emphasised reforming the import duties on corn, replacing the existing sliding scale with a uniform rate. The Whig position lost them support amongst protectionists, and the Whigs saw heavy losses in constituencies like the West Riding, where aristocratic Whig families who held a strong tradition of unbroken representation in Parliament were rejected by the electorate.

O'Connell, who had been governing with the Whigs through a compact, felt the government's unpopularity rub off on him. His own party was shattered in the election. Barely a dozen Repealers retained their seats, and O'Connell himself lost in Dublin while his son was defeated in Carlow. The Chartists picked up only a few votes.

== Results ==

UK General Election 1841
Party	Candidates						Votes		
Party	Stood	Elected	Gained	Unseated	Net	% of total	%	No.	Net %
Conservative	498	367			+53	55.78	51.62	306,314	+2.6
Whig	388	271			−73	41.19	46.15	273,902	−4.8
Irish Repeal	22	20	20	0	+20	3.04	2.11	12,537	N/A
Chartist	8	0	0	0	0	0	0.12	692	N/A

=== Voting summary ===
Popular vote
Conservative	51.62%
Whig	46.15%
Irish Repeal	2.11%
Chartist	0.12%

=== Seats summary ===
Parliamentary seats
Conservative	55.78%
Whig	41.19%
Irish Repeal	3.04%

=== Regional results ===
==== Great Britain ====
Party	Candidates	Unopposed	Seats	Seats change	Votes	%	% change
Conservative	439	185	326	+42	286,650	52.7	+4.5
Whig	333	83	229	−42	256,774	47.2	−4.6
Chartist	8	0	0	Same position	692	0.1	New entry
Total	780	268	555	Same position	544,116	100	

===== England =====
Party	Candidates	Unopposed	Seats	Seats change	Votes	%	% change
Conservative	374	147	277		272,755	53.1	
Whig	277	62	187		236,813	46.8	
Chartist	4	0	0	Same position	307	0.1	New entry
Total	655	209	464	Same position	509,875	100	

===== Scotland =====
Party	Candidates	Unopposed	Seats	Seats change	Votes	%	% change
Whig	40	13	31	-2	16,356	60.8	
Conservative	35	16	22	+2	9,793	38.3	
Chartist	3	0	0	Same position	385	0.9	New entry
Total	78	29	53	Same position	26,534	100	

===== Wales =====
Party	Candidates	Unopposed	Seats	Seats change	Votes	%	% change
Conservative	24	16	21		4,102	53.2	
Whig	16	8	11		3,605	46.8	
Chartist	1	0	0	Same position	0	0.0	New entry
Total	41	24	32	Same position	7,707	100	

==== Ireland ====
Party	Candidates	Unopposed	Seats	Seats change	Votes	%	% change
Whig	55	30	42		17,128	35.1	
Irish Conservative	59	27	41		19,664	40.1	
Irish Repeal	22	12	20		12,537	24.8	
Total	136	69	103		49,329	100	

==== Universities ====
Party	Candidates	Unopposed	Seats	Seats change	Votes	%	% change
Conservative	6	6	6	Same position	Uncontested	Uncontested	
Total	6	6	6	Same position	Uncontested	Uncontested	

== Notable Whig MPs who lost their seats ==
- Viscount Morpeth, Chief Secretary for Ireland
- Sir George Strickland, Bt
- Sir Henry Barron, 1st Baronet
