= 1837 United Kingdom general election =

- 24 July – 18 August 1837

All 658 seats in the House of Commons 330 seats needed for a majority
- Turnout: 798,025 (Note: Voting took place in 422 of 658 seats. The other 236 MPs were unopposed.)
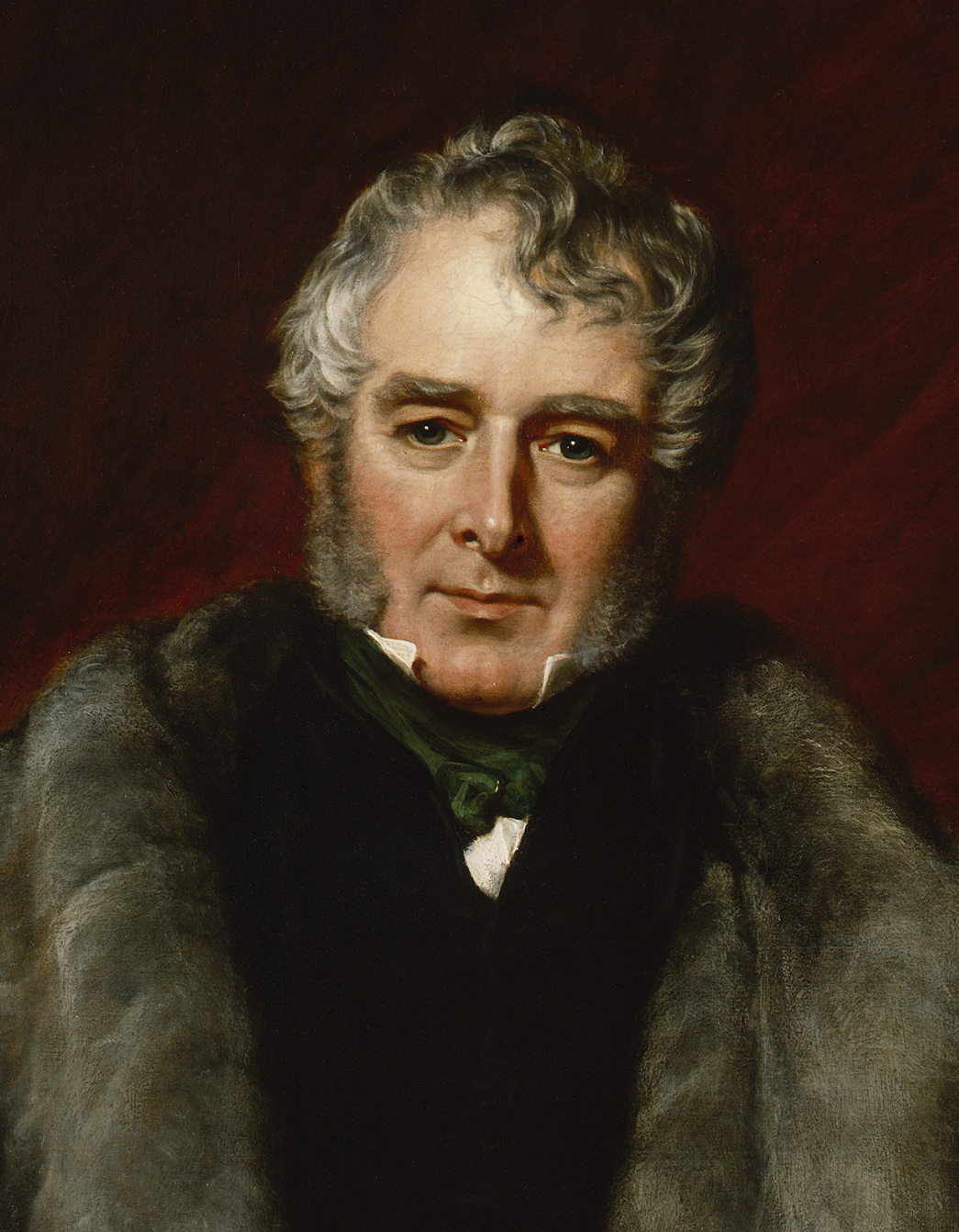

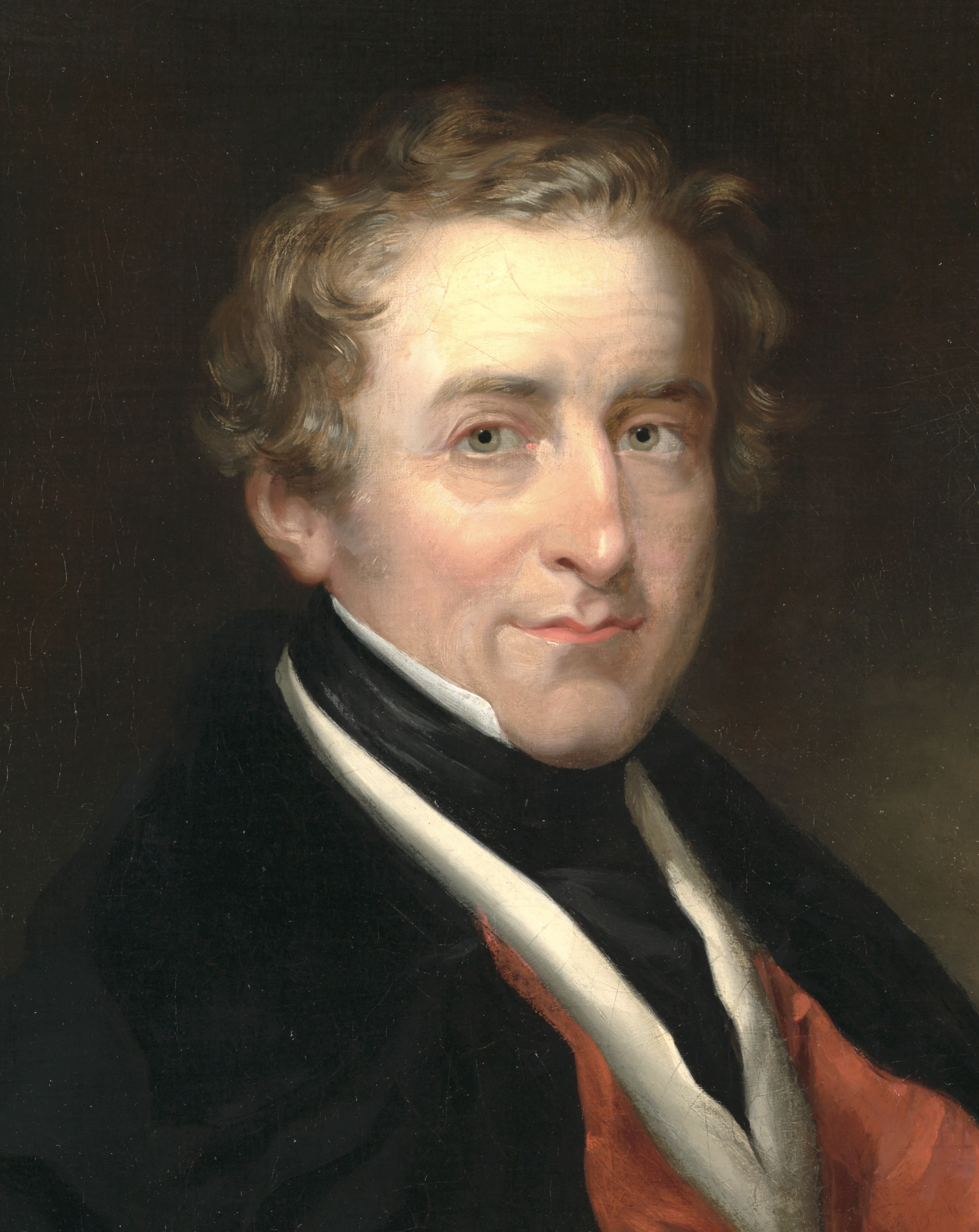
	First party	Second party
Leader	Viscount Melbourne	Sir Robert Peel
Party	Whig	Conservative
Leader since	16 July 1834	19 December 1834
Leader's seat	House of Lords	Tamworth
Last election	385 seats, 57.2%	273 seats, 42.8%
Seats won	344 (Note: Includes the Speaker of the House of Commons, as well as 115 members elected unopposed.)	314 (Note: Includes 121 members elected unopposed.)
Seat change	▼41	▲41
Popular vote	418,331	379,694
Percentage	52.4%	47.6%
Swing	▼4.8 pp	▲4.8 pp
- Colours denote the winning party

- Composition of the House of Commons after the election
Prime Minister before election
Viscount Melbourne
Whig
Prime Minister after
election
Viscount Melbourne
Whig

The 1837 United Kingdom general election was held from 24 July to 18 August 1837, following the death of King William IV and the accession of Queen Victoria. The election saw the Whigs secure their fourth consecutive victory, though the Conservatives, led by Robert Peel, continued to gain ground.

The election marked the last time that a Parliament was dissolved as a result of the demise of the Crown. The dissolution of Parliament six months after a demise of the Crown, as provided for by the Succession to the Crown Act 1707, was abolished by the Reform Act 1867.

== Results ==

UK General Election 1837
Party	Candidates						Votes		
Party	Stood	Elected	Gained	Unseated	Net	% of total	%	No.	Net %
Whig	510	344 (Note: The seat and vote count figures for the Whigs given here include the Speaker of the House of Commons)			−41	52.28	52.42	418,331	−4.8
Conservative	484	314			+41	47.72	47.58	379,694	+4.8

=== Voting summary ===
Popular vote
Whig	52.42%
Conservative	47.58%

=== Seats summary ===
Parliamentary seats
Whig	52.28%
Conservative	47.72%

=== Regional results ===
==== Great Britain ====
Party	Candidates	Unopposed	Seats	Seats change	Votes	%	% change
Conservative	414	102	284	+46	353,000	48.2	+5.4
Whig	422	81	271	−46	379,961	51.8	−5.4
Total	836	183	555	Same position	732,961	100	

===== England =====
Party	Candidates	Unopposed	Seats	Seats change	Votes	%	% change
Conservative	348	80	239	+39	321,124	48.9	+6.3
Whig	352	60	225	−39	347,549	51.1	−6.3
Total	658	177	464	Same position	491,540	100	

===== Scotland =====
Party	Candidates	Unopposed	Seats	Seats change	Votes	%	% change
Whig	49	15	33	−5	22,082	54.0	−8.8
Conservative	35	7	20	+5	18,569	46.0	+8.8
Total	84	22	53	Same position	40,651	100	

===== Wales =====
Party	Candidates	Unopposed	Seats	Seats change	Votes	%	% change
Conservative	25	11	19	+2	11,616	52.8	−11.1
Whig	20	6	13	−2	10,144	47.2	+11.1
Total	45	17	32	Same position	21,760	100	

==== Ireland ====
Party	Candidates	Unopposed	Seats	Seats change	Votes	%	% change
Whig/Repeal Coalition	88	34	73	+5	38,370	58.5	+9.9
Irish Conservative	70	19	30	−5	26,694	41.5	−9.9
Total	158	53	103		65,064	100	

==== Universities ====
Party	Candidates	Unopposed	Seats	Seats change	Votes	%	% change
Conservative	6	4	6	Same position	1,691	90.1	
Whig	1	0	0	Same position	186	9.9	
Total	6	6	6	Same position	1,877	100	
