= Charles II Street =

Street in St James's, London

Coordinates: 51°30′28.63″N 0°7′59.2″W

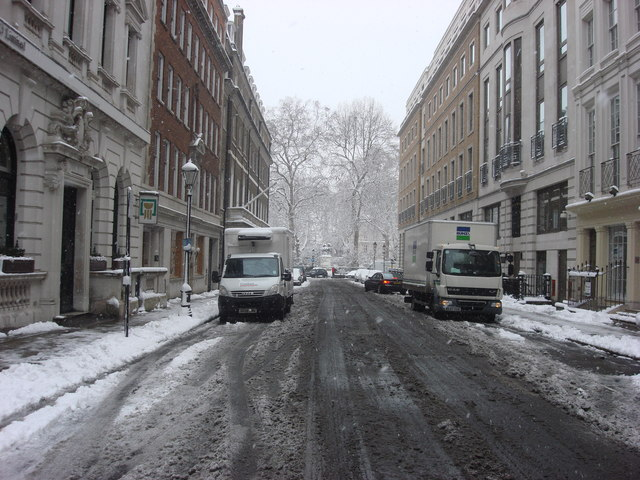
Charles II Street, 2009

Charles II Street is a street in St James's in the City of Westminster, London.

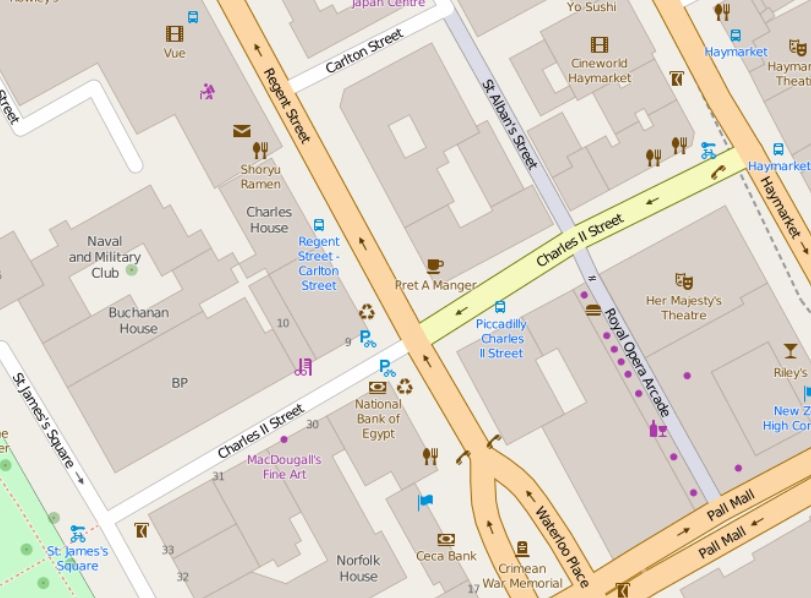
The immediate vicinity of Charles II Street.

It runs roughly west to east, starting from the middle of the east side of St James's Square, crossing Regent Street, where it becomes Waterloo Place, and ending at Haymarket. At its eastern end it is joined by St Alban's Street on its north side and the Royal Opera Arcade, which runs south to join Pall Mall.

The street, originally known as Charles Street, was built by about 1665, and the first recorded mention was in 1672. Until 1818, when it was extended to join the Haymarket, Charles Street terminated at (the former) Market Lane. Access to the Haymarket was only available via the courtyard of the Bell Inn.

The Security Service (MI5) was based at 16 Charles Street from 1916 to 1919. The road was renamed Charles II Street in 1939.
