= Equestrian statue of William III, London =

Statue in St James's Square, London

Coordinates: 51.5072°N 0.1353°W

Equestrian statue of William III
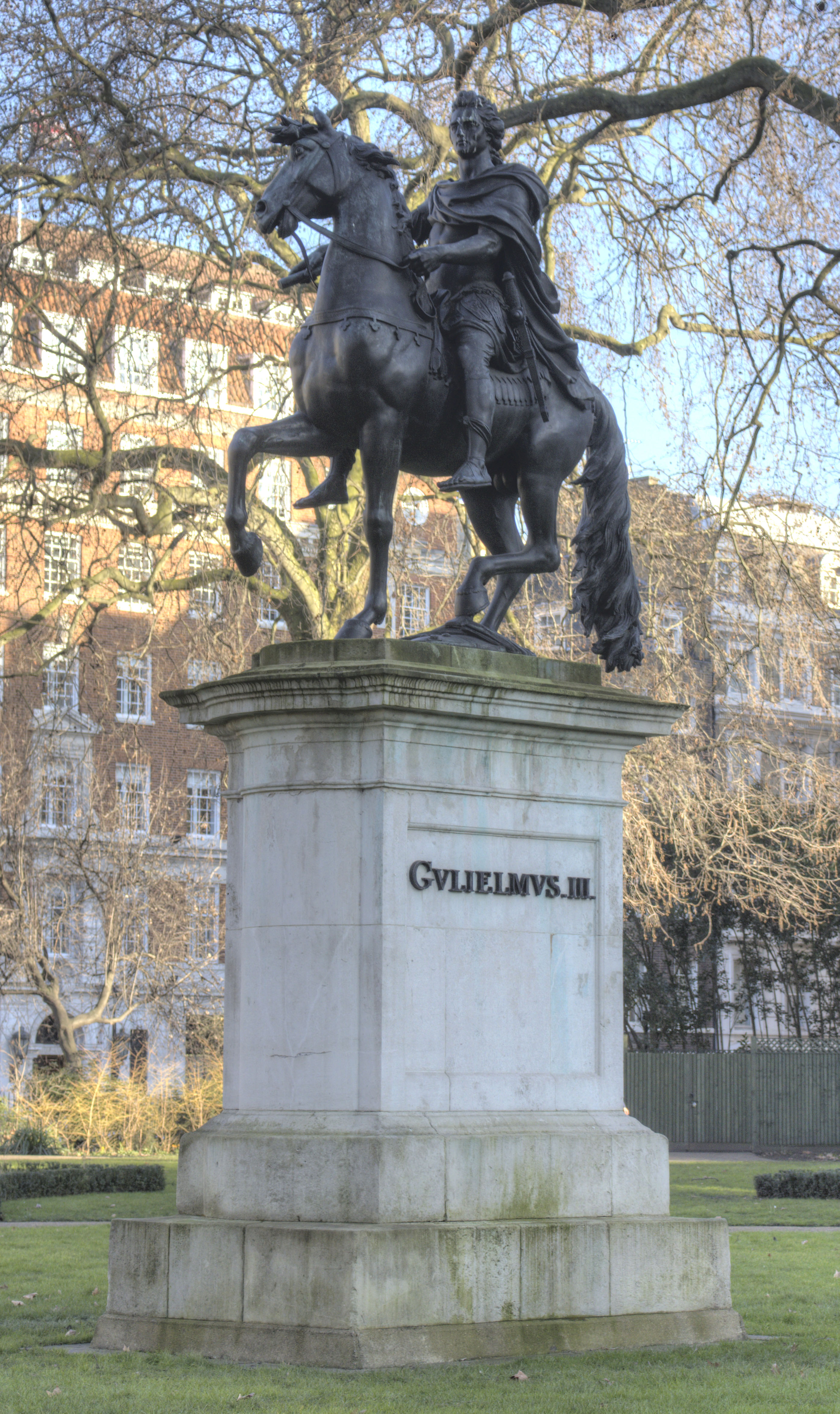
- Artist: John Bacon Junior
- Completion date: 1808; 218 years ago
- Type: Equestrian statue
- Medium: Bronze
- Subject: William III
- Location: St James's Square London SW1

Listed Building – Grade I
- Official name: Statue of William III (in centre of square)
- Designated: 24 February 1958
- Reference no.: 1235855

The equestrian statue of William III by John Bacon Junior stands in St James's Square in central London. It is modelled on an earlier statue of the king by John Michael Rysbrack in Queen Square, Bristol. Funding for the London statue was provided in the will of Samuel Travers, M.P., dated 1724, but nothing was done to progress the plan for a further seventy years. A design for the monument was drawn up in 1794 by Bacon's father, John Bacon Senior, but this was not executed and the commission passed to Bacon Jr., under whose direction the statue was finally erected in 1808. The statue is a Grade I listed structure.

== History ==
William III, Prince of Orange, ascended the English throne in 1688 following the overthrow of James II in the Glorious Revolution. William ruled jointly with his wife, Mary, James's daughter, until her death in 1694, and then solely until his own death in 1702. In 1697 the first proposal had been made to erect a statue in the king's honour in St James's Square, home to many of his strongest supporters. Nothing was done, however, and two further attempts to revive the plan, in 1710 and 1721, also failed. In 1724, a member of Parliament and Crown official, Samuel Travers, left a bequest in his will to fund the construction "in St. James's Square or on Cheapside Conduit an equestrian statue in brass to the glorious memory of my master William the Third". Nevertheless, it was a further seventy years before the commission to design the statue was granted to John Bacon Sr., then England's most notable sculptor, in 1794. Bacon Sr. died before the commission could be executed, and the final design and construction was undertaken in 1808 by his son, John Bacon Jr. The statue was originally sited in the middle of an octagonal pool, but this was drained in the 19th century.

== Description ==
The sculpture is in bronze and depicts William in the style of a Roman general. It is heavily influenced by the earlier equestrian statue of William undertaken by Rysbrack and erected in Bristol in 1736. The king is depicted astride a "spirited" horse and, despite his Classical style of dress, William's hairstyle follows late 17th century fashion. Jo Darke, in her history of English and Welsh monuments, suggests that the base of the statue includes a depiction of the molehill, over which William's horse Sorrel stumbled at Hampton Court, leading to the king's death from complications of pneumonia. Panels on either side of the plinth carry inscriptions in bronze lettering, the first reading GVLIELMVS III and the second I. BACON, IVNR. SCVLPTR. 1807.

The statue was designated a Grade I listed structure, the highest grading given to buildings and structures of "exceptional interest", in 1958.

== Bibliography ==
- Blackwood, John (1989). London's Immortals: The Complete Outdoor Commemorative Statues. London: Savoy Press. ISBN 0-9514296-0-4. OCLC 21328602.
- Bradley, Simon; Pevsner, Nikolaus (2003). London: Westminster. The Buildings of England. New Haven, US, London, UK: Yale University Press. ISBN 9780300095951. OCLC 609428632.
- Darke, Jo (1991). The Monument Guide to England and Wales: A National Portrait in Bronze and Stone. London: MacDonald and Co. OCLC 1008240876.
- Troost, Wout (2005). William III, The Stadholder-king: A Political Biography. Aldershot, UK: Ashgate Press. ISBN 9780754650713. OCLC 470178112.

== See also ==
- Cultural depictions of William III of England
