= John Bacon (sculptor, born 1777) =

English sculptor, born 1777

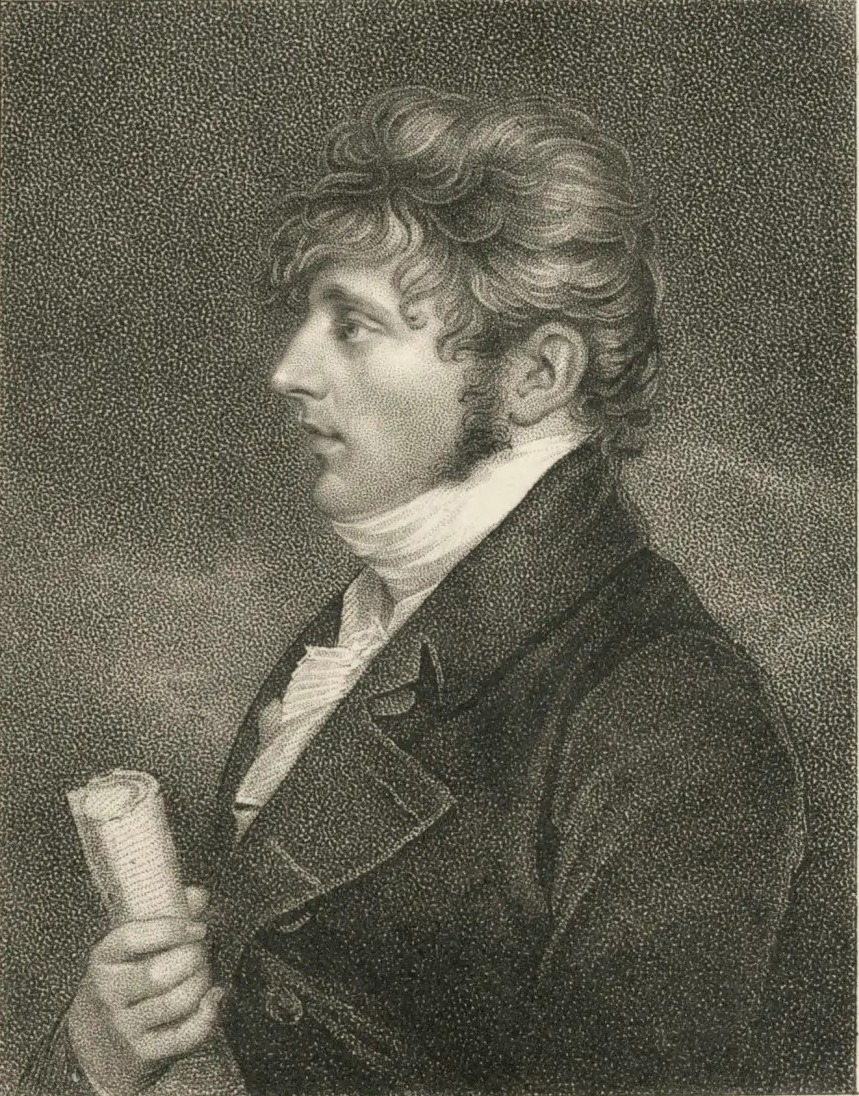
- Born: 13 March 1777; London
- Died: 14 July 1859; Bath
- Occupation: Sculptor
- Father: John Bacon
- Relatives: Thomas Bacon

John Bacon (1777–1859), also known as John Bacon the Younger, or Junior, to distinguish him from his equally famous father, was an English sculptor.

== Biography ==
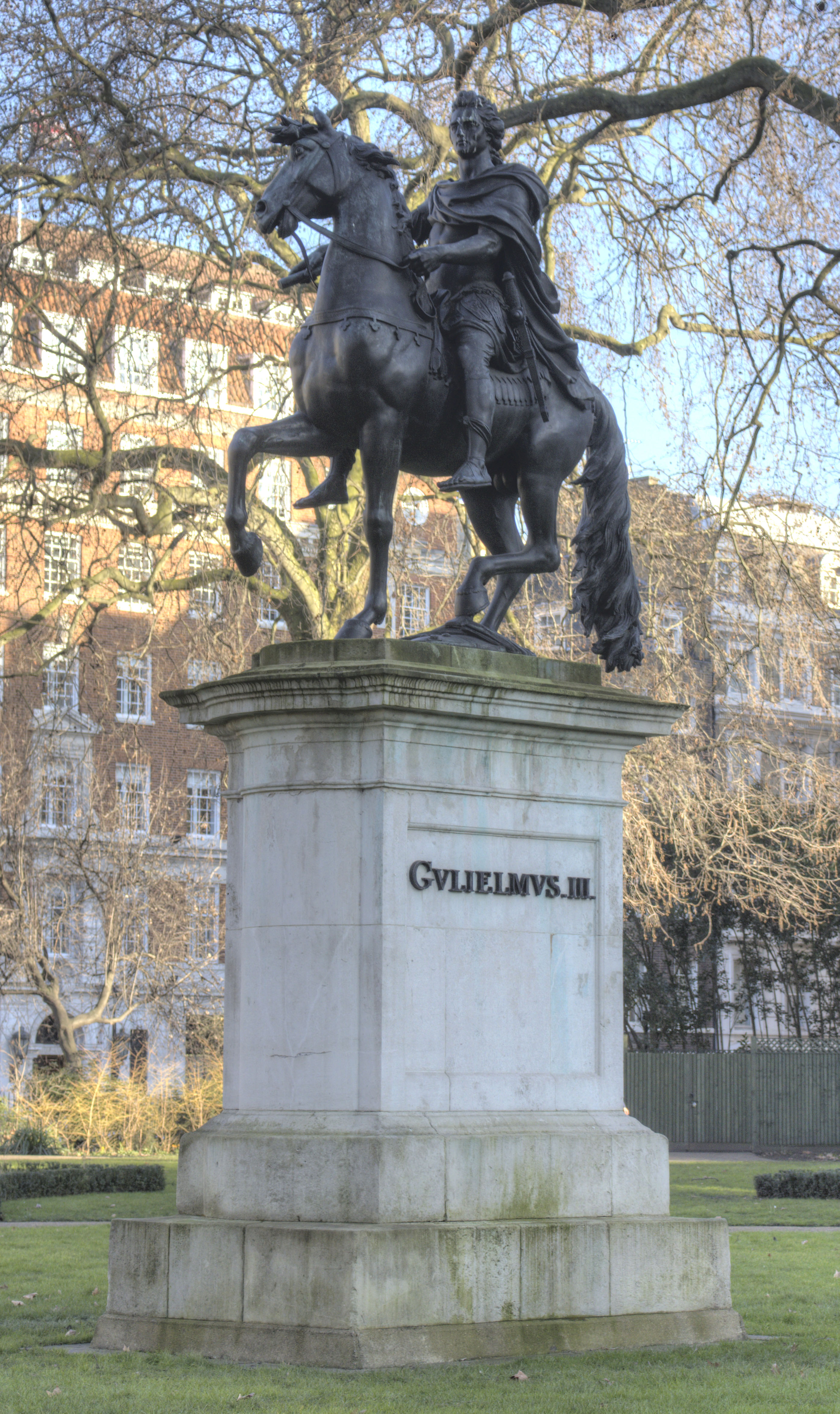
Equestrian statue of William III, London

Bacon was the second son of the sculptor John Bacon and his wife Elizabeth Wade. He was born at his parents' home in Newman Street in the City of Westminster on 13 March 1777. He entered the Royal Academy Schools at the age of twelve, one of the youngest pupils ever admitted.

At fifteen, Bacon exhibited his first work; at sixteen, he was awarded the silver medal of the Royal Academy; and in 1797 he won the gold medal for his statue of Cassandra. His brother Thomas Bacon also exhibited at the Royal Academy between 1793 and 1795. Their father died in 1799, and the younger John Bacon succeeded to his business. He finished such works as he found in progress, including the well-known statue of Lord Cornwallis, and managed to secure ample patronage for himself. He ceased to exhibit at the academy in 1824.

Building projects included the figure of Providence on Trinity House in 1796 and replacing the figures of "Madness" and "Melancholy" over the entrance to Bethlem Hospital (better known as Bedlam) in 1814.

There are six of Bacon's monuments in St Paul's Cathedral and at least eight in Westminster Abbey. There are also two in Windsor Castle.

From 1818 until 1843, Bacon worked in partnership with his former pupil Samuel Manning, but their work appears to be largely by Manning, taking advantage of Bacon's reputation but, in the view of the art historian Rupert Gunnis, lacking the quality of Bacon's work. Bacon himself went into virtual retirement from 1830. He contributed articles on sculpture to Rees's Cyclopædia.

In 1801 he was married to Susanna Sophia Taylor (born 1782). He died in Bath, Somerset on 14 July 1859.

== Selected public works ==
Image	Title / subject	Location and coordinates	Date	Type	Material	Dimensions	Designation	Wikidata	Notes
	Bishop John Thomas	Westminster Abbey, London	1793	Bust	Marble				Also attributed to John Bacon, Senior.
More images	Captain Edward Cooke RN	Westminster Abbey, London	1799	Sculpture group on pedestal with background relief	Marble				
More images	Sir John Meredith	Brecon Cathedral, Powys	1800	Deep relief plaque	Stone				
	Memorial to Rear Admiral Thomas Totty	Westminster Abbey, London	1802	Relief plaque	Marble				
	Charles Cornwallis, 1st Marquess Cornwallis	Victoria Memorial, Kolkata	1803	Statue					1809 copy in Bombay
	Memorial to Benjamin & Richard Forbes	Westminster Abbey, London	1803	Relief plaque	Marble				
More images	Captains John Harvey RN and John Hutt RN	Westminster Abbey, London	1804	Sculpture group	Marble				
More images	Memorial to Richard Solly	Worcester Cathedral	1804	Sculpture group	Marble				
More images	General Thomas Dundas	St Paul's Cathedral, London	1805	Bust & sculpture group on pedestal	Marble				
	Monument to Lady Maria Micklethwaite	Church of SS Mary and Margaret, Sprowston, Norfolk	1805						
More images	Captain George Duff RN	St Paul's Cathedral, London	1806	Sculpture group on narrow pedestal	Marble				
More images	Lord Henniker	Rochester Cathedral, Kent	1806	Sculpture group & relief					
More images	Christian Friedrich Schwarz	St. Mary's Church, Chennai. India	1807	Low relief sculpture	Marble				
More images	Statue of King William III	St James's Square, London	1808	Equestrian statue on pedestal	Bronze & stone		Grade I	Q17527231	
More images	Admiral Richard Kempenfelt,	Westminster Abbey, London	1808	Pillar with relief & inscriptions	Marble				
More images	George Nicholas Hardinge	St. Thomas Cathedral, Mumbai	1808						
	Jane Amelia Russell (1789-1808)	St. Mary's Church, Chennai, India	c. 1808	Relief & sculpture group	Marble				
More images	Sir John Moore,	St Paul's Cathedral, London	1809	Sculpture group on pedestal	Marble				
More images	George Gilbert Keble	St. Mary's Church, Chennai, India	c. 1811	Sculpture groups	Marble				
	Memorial to the children of Richard Down	St James the Great, Friern Barnet	1814						
More images	Charles Agar, 1st Earl of Normanton	Westminster Abbey, London	1815	Sculpture group	Marble				
More images	Colonel Henry Walton Ellis	Worcester Cathedral	After 1815	Sculpture group	Marble				
	Charles Robert Ross	St. Mary's Church, Chennai, India	c. 1816	Low relief sculpture	Marble				
More images	Warren Hastings	Westminster Abbey, London	1818	Bust & plaque	Bronze				Designed by Bacon with a bust by Samuel Manning

== Other works ==
Bacon's notable works include:

- Moses Striking the Rock (1792) RA
- Bust of his father, John Bacon RA (1798)

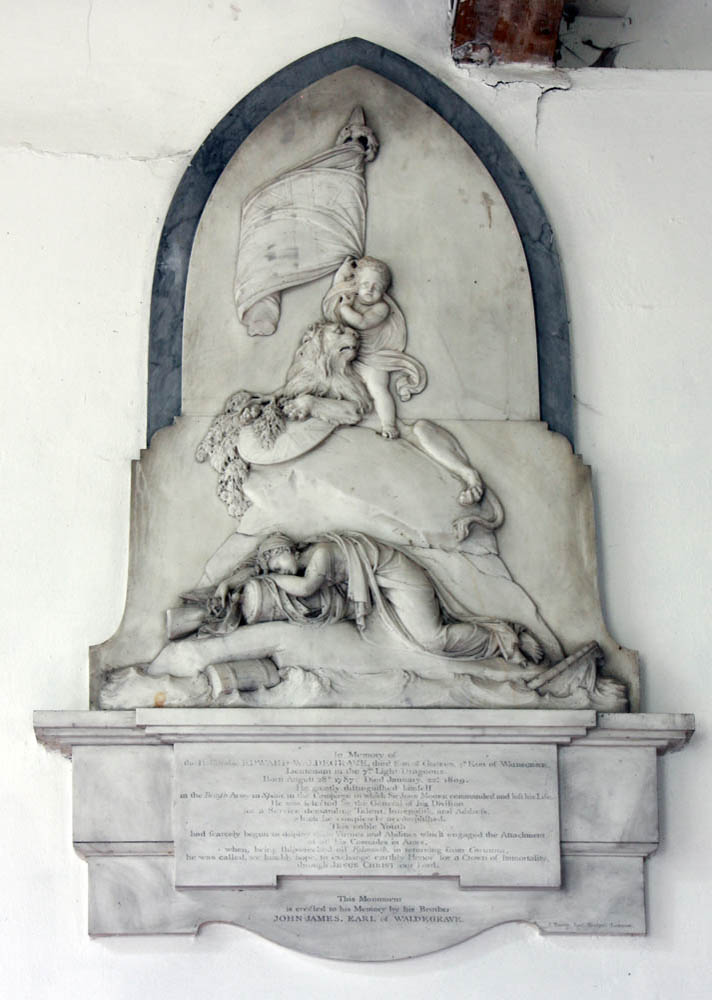
Monument to Edward Waldergrave, Church of St Thomas the Apostle, Navestock, Essex

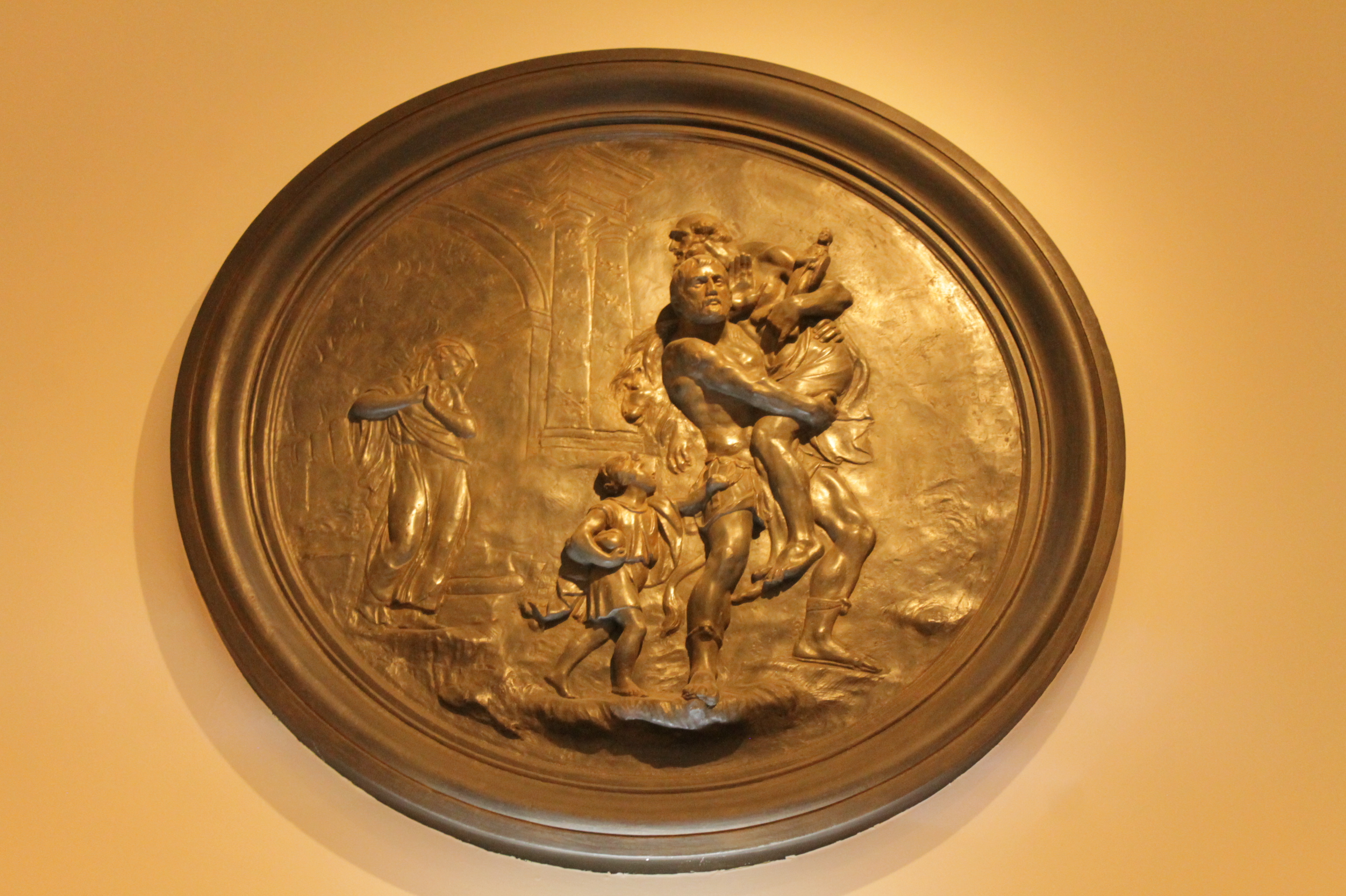
The Flight of Aeneas from Troy by John Bacon the Younger, Foundling Museum, London

- Monument to Edward Waldergrave, Church of St Thomas the Apostle, Navestock, Essex
- Tomb of Dr William Heberden (1801) in Windsor Parish Church
- Monument to Lord Rokeby, Armagh Cathedral, (1802)
- Bust of William Markham, Archbishop of York (1804) in Christ Church, Oxford
- Bust of Dr Maxwell Garthshore (1804) at RA
- Monument to John Burland, Wells Cathedral, (1804)
- Monuments, featuring carved military trophies and symbols, to John Yorke, died 1798, and Martin Yorke, died 1805, in the Church of St Mary the Virgin, Speldhurst Hill, Kent
- Monument to Joseph Sykes, died 1805, Church of Saint Andrew, Kirk Ella, East Yorkshire
- Monument to Francis Heneage, died 1807, in the Church of Saint Mary, Hainton, East Lindsey, Lincolnshire
- Several monuments to members of the Langham family, who died between 1807 and 1812, in the Church of All Saints, Cottesbrooke, Northamptonshire
- Monument to Sir William Bensley, Bletchingley, Surrey (1809)
- Monument to General Giles Stibbert (1809) in South Stoneham
- Memorial, a deep relief plaque, to Captain George Bryan, Westminster Abbey, (1809)
- Monument consisting of a panel and sculpture group, now separated, to General Coote Manningham, Westminster Abbey (1809)
- Monument to Thomas Drake Tyrwhitt-Drake (1809) in Amersham
- Statues of Marquess Wellesley, Calcutta and Mumbai, (1809)
- Monument to Dr John Littlehales MD, Winchester Cathedral, (1810)
- Monument to Charles Lawson, Manchester Cathedral, (1810)
- Monument to John Creighton, St. John's Anglican Church (Lunenburg), Nova Scotia, (1810)
- Memorial, with medallion portrait, to Dr John Plenderleath, Westminster Abbey, (1811)
- Monument to General Crawfurd and General Henry MacKinnon, St Paul's Cathedral, (1812)
- Statue of George III, Bank of Ireland (1813)
- Monument to Admiral Sir William Rowley, Stoke-by-Nayland, Suffolk, (1813)
- Monument to George Fraser, Canterbury Cathedral, (1813)
- Tablet memorials to Thomas and Sophia Lambard, 1813, the Parish Church of Saint Peter and Saint Paul, Sevenoaks, Kent
- Memorial to Sarah Mansfield, died 1813, Church of Saint James the Great, Birstall, Leicestershire
- Monument to Sir Thomas Trigge, Westminster Abbey, (1814)
- Memorial, now lost, to Rev Dr Luttrell Wynne, Westminster Abbey cloisters (1814)
- Monument to Baron Heathfield, died 1813, in the Church of Saint Andrew, Buckland Monachorum, Devon
- Monument to Sir Henry Sullivan (1814) in Thames Ditton
- Monument to Henry Jodrell MP (1814) in Letheringsett
- Memorial tablet to Mary Markham, Westminster Abbey cloisters, (1814)
- Monuments to members of the Starkey family, who died between 1805 and 1815, in St Margaret's Church, Wrenbury, Cheshire
- Monument to Sir Henry Strachey, 1st Baronet (1816) in Chew Magna
- Monument to the Duchess of Chandos (1816) in Worlingworth
- Wall monument to Sir John Sheffield and Rev. Robert Sheffield, 1816, Church of St Andrew, Burton upon Stather, Lincolnshire
- Monument to Sir John Lombe (1817) in Bylaugh
- Monuments to Lydia Buckley, died 1812, and John Buckley, died 1817, in the Brockhampton Chapel, Herefordshire
- Memorial to Lieutenant Thomas Davies, St. Mary's Church, Chennai (1818)
- Monument to Bishop John Parsons, Balliol College, Oxford (1818)
- Monument to Edward Madden, Chichester Cathedral, (1819)
- Monument to Augusta Slade, Chester Cathedral, (1822)
- Monument to Admiral Sir John Borlase Warren, Stratton Audley, Oxfordshire (1822)
- Reredos of St Laurence's Church in Exeter (c.1835)
- The Flight of Aeneas from Troy, Foundling Museum, London (1839) panel over doorway
- Tomb of his daughter aka Mrs Medley in St Thomas' Church, Exeter (1842)
- Wall memorial, with figure, to Rev. Thomas Robinson, Church of Saint Mary de Castro, Leicester Castle Yard
- A monument in the Church of Saint Mary, Churchgate, Stockport
- The Victoria and Albert Museum in London holds two memorials by Bacon from demolished churches;- a memorial to Anna Rhodes, 1764-1796, from the church of St. James's, Hampstead Road, London and a marble memorial plaque to Elizabeth Raynsford, 1722-1810, from the church of St. Denis at Faxton, Northants.

=== With Samuel Manning ===
- Memorial to Robert, Viscount Kilmorey (1818) at Adderley
- Memorial to Walter, Marquess of Ormonde (1820) in Ulcombe
- Memorial to Francis, Earl of Kilmorey (1824) at Adderley
- Memorial to Sir John Walsh, 1st Baronet (1825) at Warfield
