= 1835 United Kingdom general election =

- 6 January – 6 February 1835

All 658 seats in the House of Commons 330 seats needed for a majority
- Turnout: 611,137
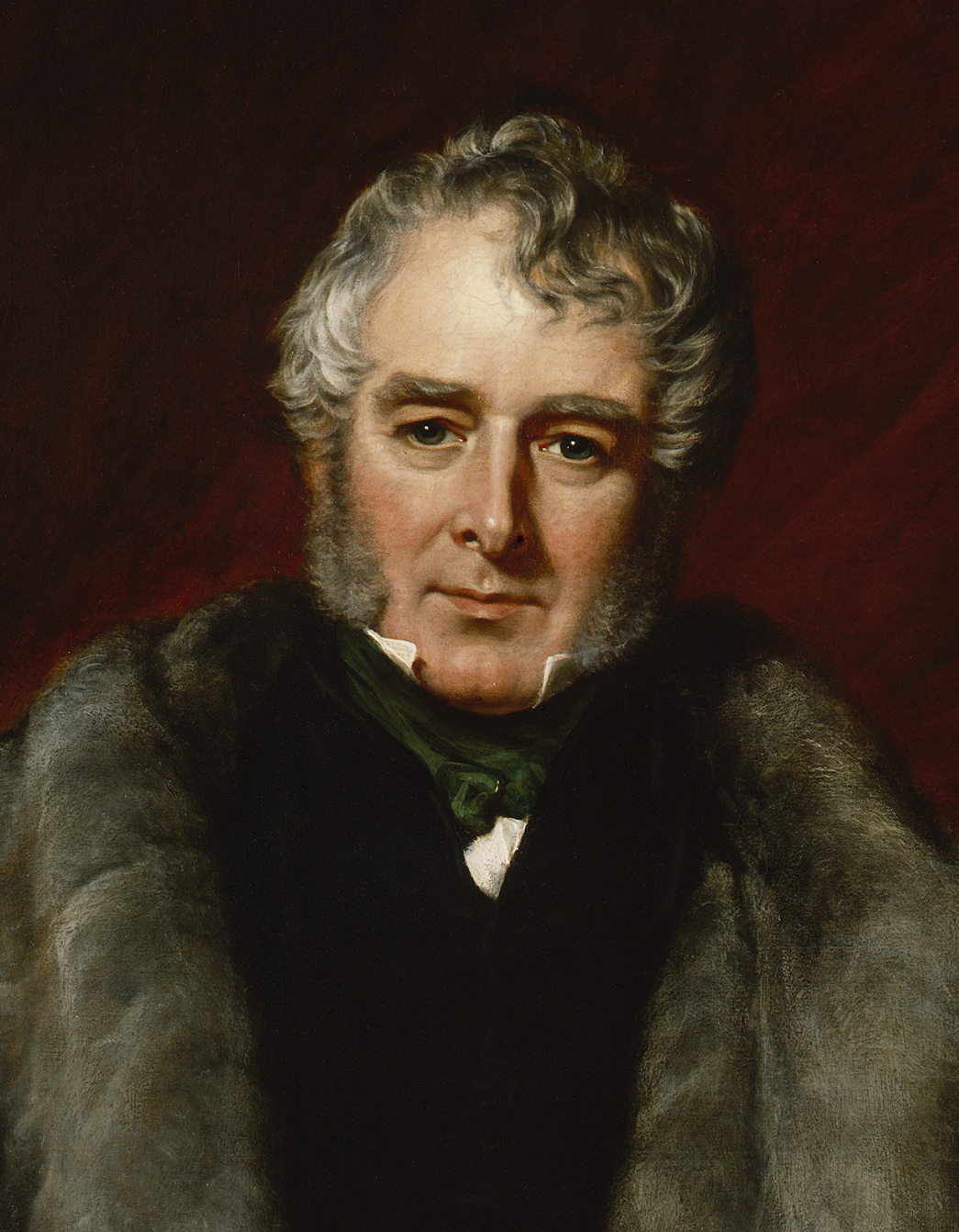

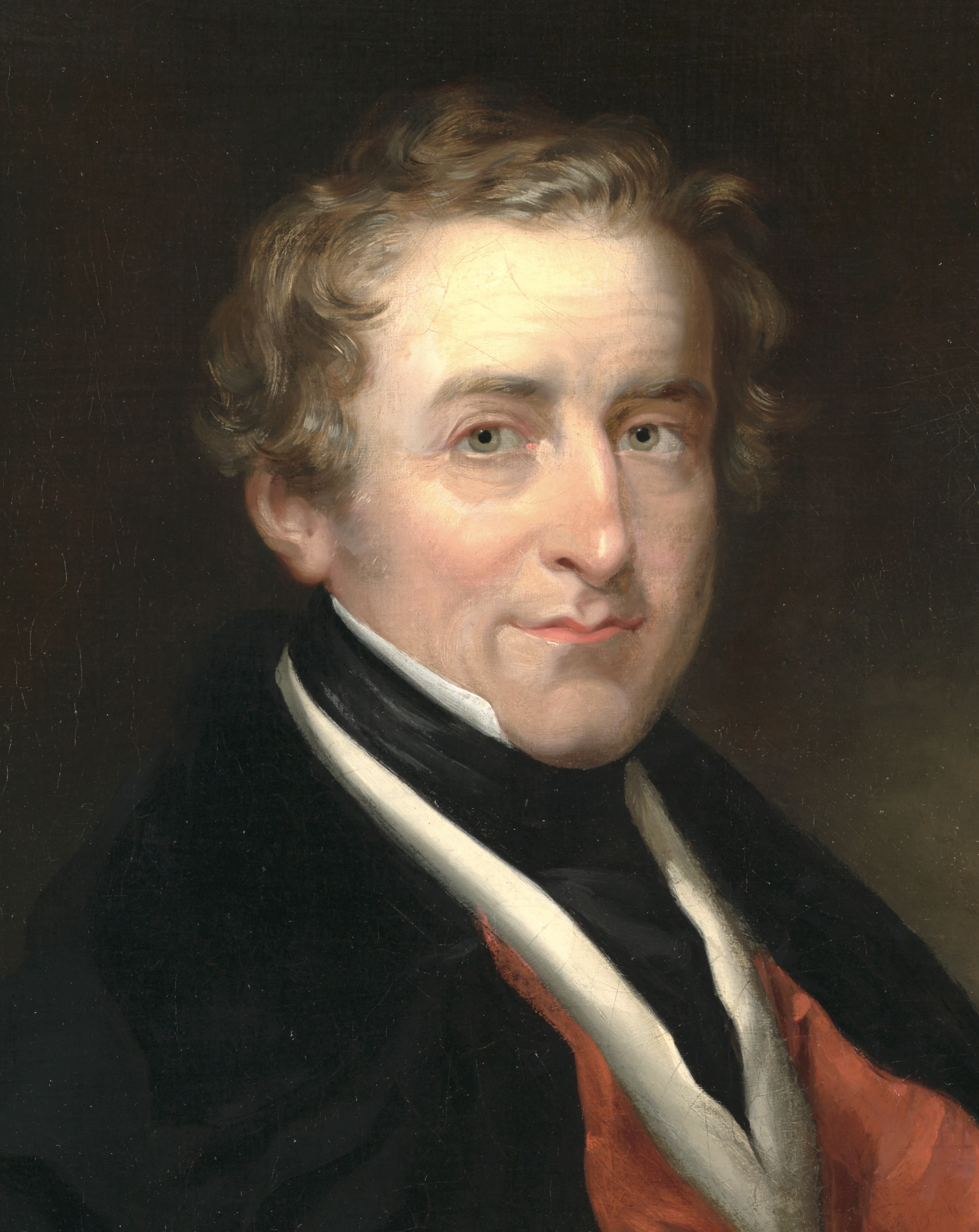
	First party	Second party
Leader	Viscount Melbourne	Sir Robert Peel
Party	Whig	Conservative
Leader since	16 July 1834	19 December 1834
Leader's seat	House of Lords	Tamworth
Last election	483 seats, 70.8% (Note: Combined 1832 result for Whigs and Irish Repeal)	175 seats, 29.2%
Seats won	385 (Note: Includes 154 members elected unopposed.)	273 (Note: Includes 121 members elected unopposed.)
Seat change	▼98	▲98
Popular vote	349,868 (Note: Voting took place in just 383 of 658 seats. The other 275 MPs were unopposed.)	261,269
Percentage	57.2%	42.8%
Swing	▼13.6 pp	▲13.6 pp
- Colours denote the winning party

- Composition of the House of Commons after the election
Prime Minister before election
Sir Robert Peel
Conservative
Prime Minister after
election
Viscount Melbourne
Whig

The 1835 United Kingdom general election was called when Parliament was dissolved on 29 December 1834. Polling took place between 6 January and 6 February 1835, and the results saw Robert Peel's Conservatives make large gains from their low of the 1832 election, but the Whigs maintained a large majority.

Under the terms of the Lichfield House Compact the Whigs had entered into an electoral pact with the Irish Repeal Association of Daniel O'Connell, which had contested the previous election as a separate party. The Radicals were also included in this alliance.

== Dates of election ==
The eleventh United Kingdom Parliament was dissolved on 29 December 1834. The new Parliament was summoned to meet on 19 February 1835, for a maximum seven-year term from that date. The maximum term could be and normally was curtailed, by the monarch dissolving the Parliament, before its term expired.

At this period there was not one election day. After receiving a writ (a royal command) for the election to be held, the local returning officer fixed the election timetable for the particular constituency or constituencies he was concerned with. Polling in seats with contested elections could continue for many days.

The general election took place between January and February 1835. The first nomination was on 5 January, with the first contest on 6 January and the last contest on 6 February 1835. It was usual for polling in the university constituencies and in Orkney and Shetland to take place about a week after other seats. Disregarding contests in the Universities and Orkney and Shetland, the last poll was on 27 January 1835.

Peel ran a minority Conservative government until 8 April 1835, after being unable to form a majority. Melbourne subsequently became Prime Minister forming a Whig government.

== Results ==

UK General Election 1835
Party	Candidates						Votes		
Party	Stood	Elected	Gained	Unseated	Net	% of total	%	No.	Net %
Whig	538	385			−56	58.51	57.25	349,868	−9.7
Conservative	407	273			+98	41.49	42.75	261,269	+13.6

Party	Candidates	Unopposed	Seats
Whig	538	154	385
Conservative	407	121	273
Total	945	275	658

=== Voting summary ===
Popular vote
Whig	57.25%
Conservative	42.75%

=== Seats summary ===
Parliamentary seats
Whig	58.51%
Conservative	41.49%

=== Regional results ===
==== Great Britain ====
Party	Candidates	Unopposed	Seats	Seats change	Votes	%	% change
Whig	451	126	317	−91	315,002	57.2	−13.9
Conservative	338	102	238	+91	235,907	42.8	+13.9
Total	789	228	555	Same position	550,909	100	

===== England =====
Party	Candidates	Unopposed	Seats	Seats change	Votes	%	% change
Whig	380	100	264	−83	281,576	57.4	−13.4
Conservative	278	77	200	+84	209,964	42.6	+13.4
Total	658	177	464	Same position	491,540	100	

===== Scotland =====
Party	Candidates	Unopposed	Seats	Seats change	Votes	%	% change
Whig	52	15	38	−5	28,307	62.8	−16.2
Conservative	33	8	15	+5	15,733	37.2	+16.2
Total	85	23	53	Same position	44,040	100	

===== Wales =====
Party	Candidates	Unopposed	Seats	Seats change	Votes	%	% change
Conservative	21	11	17	+3	10,210	66.6	+12.6
Whig	19	11	15	−3	5,119	33.4	−12.6
Total	40	22	32	Same position	15,329	100	

==== Ireland ====
Party	Candidates	Unopposed	Seats	Seats change	Votes	%	% change
Whig/Repeal Coalition	87	28	68	−7	34,866	57.6	−10.3
Irish Conservative	69	19	35	+7	25,362	42.4	+10.3
Total	156	47	103		60,228	100	

==== Universities ====
Party	Candidates	Unopposed	Seats	Seats change	Votes	%	% change
Conservative	6	6	6	Same position	Uncontested		
Total	6	6	6	Same position	None	100	
