= 1835 United Kingdom general election in Ireland =

- 6 January – 6 February 1835

105 of the 658 seats to the House of Commons
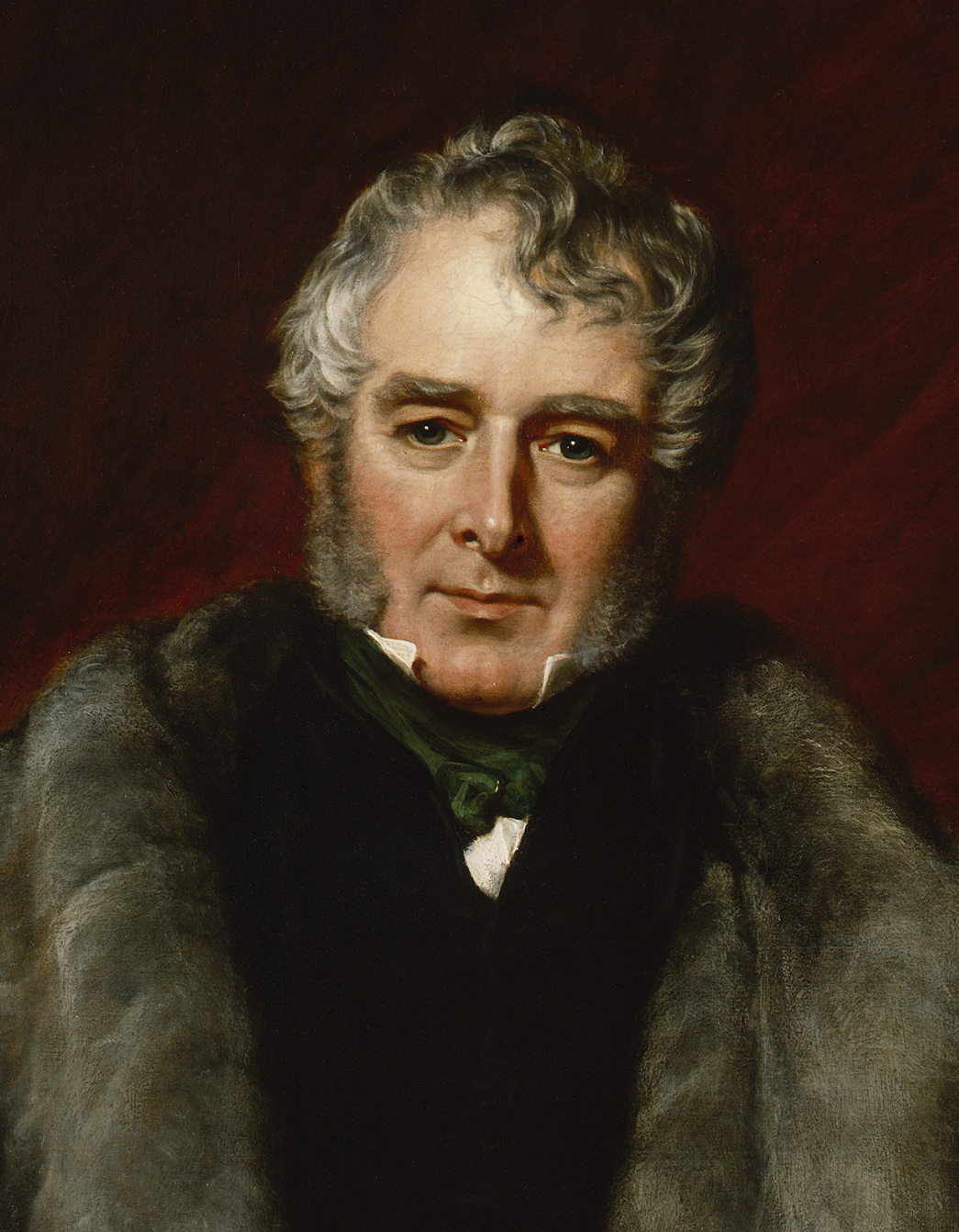

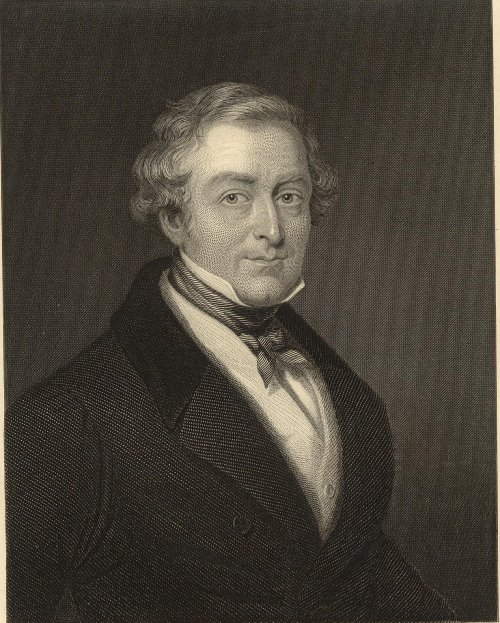
	First party	Second party
Leader	Viscount Melbourne	Robert Peel
Party	Whig	Conservative
Alliance	Lichfield House Compact
Leader since	16 July 1834	19 December 1834
Leader's seat	House of Lords	Tamworth
Seats won	68	37
Seat change	▼7	▲7
Popular vote	34,866	25,362
Percentage	57.6%	42.4%
Swing	▼10.3%	▲10.3%
- Results of the 1835 election in Ireland

The 1835 British general election in Ireland saw a Lichfield House Compact of Whigs, Radicals, and the Repeal Association winning a majority of Irish seats. The coalition in total won 68 seats, with the number of seats won being: Repeal (34), Whig (34), and Tory (35 + 2 Dublin University seats).

== Results ==
Party	Candidates	Unopposed	Seats	Seats change	Votes	%	% Change
Whig/Repeal Association	87	28	68	▼7	34,866	57.6	▼10.3
Irish Conservative	69	19	35	▲7	25,362	42.4	▲10.3
Total	156	47	103	—	60,228	100	

Vote totals do not include those from Dublin University.

Popular vote
Whigs	57.89%
Irish Conservative	42.10%

Parliamentary seats
Whigs	64.76%
Irish Conservative	35.23%

== See also ==
- History of Ireland (1801–1923)
