= St James's Square =

Square in the City of Westminster, London

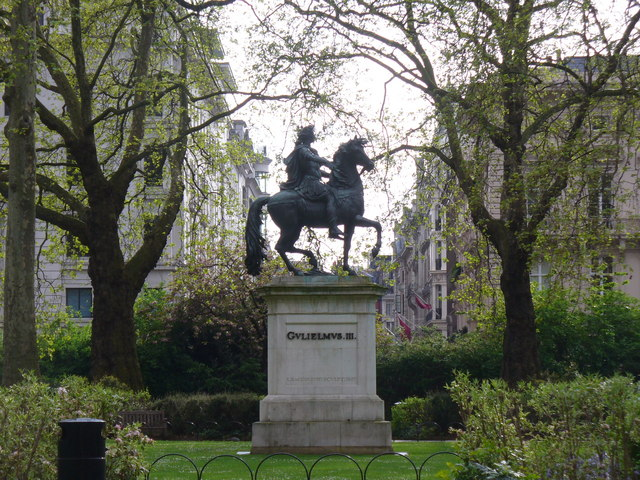
- The statue of William III by John Bacon at the centre of the square
- Interactive map of St James's Square
- Location: St James's, London
- Coordinates: 51°30′26″N 00°08′07″W
- Open: 10am – 4:30pm daily

St James's Square is the only square in the St James's district of the City of Westminster and is a garden square. It has predominantly Georgian and Neo-Georgian architecture. For its first two hundred or so years it was one of the three or four most fashionable residential streets in London. It now has headquarters of a number of well-known businesses, including BP and Rio Tinto Group; four private members' clubs, the East India Club, the Naval and Military Club, the Canning Club, and the Army and Navy Club; the High Commission of Cyprus; the London Library; and global think tank and peace-promoter Chatham House.

A main feature is a high, stone-plinthed equestrian statue of William III erected in 1808.

== History ==
In 1662 Charles II extended a lease over the 45 acres of Pall Mall (St James's) Field held by Henry Jermyn, 1st Earl of St Albans, to 1720 and soon afterwards the earl began to lay out the property for development. The earl petitioned the king that the class of occupants they both hoped to attract to the new district would not take houses without the prospect of eventually acquiring them outright, and in 1665 the king granted the freehold of the site of St. James's Square and some closely adjacent parts of the field to the earl's trustees. The location was convenient for the royal palaces of Whitehall and St James. The houses on the east, north and west sides of the square were soon developed, each of them being constructed separately as was usual at that time.

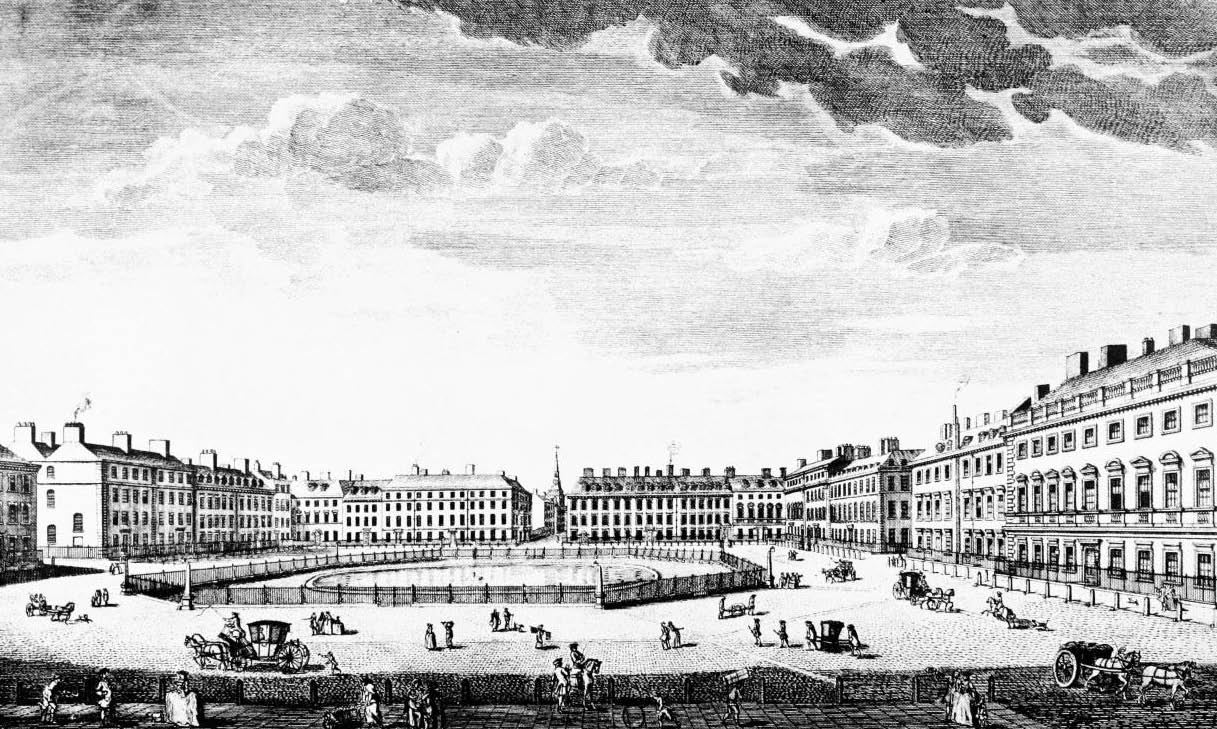
St James's Square circa 1752.

In the 1720s seven dukes and seven earls were in residence. The east, north and west sides of the square contained some of the most desirable houses in London. At first glance they do not appear much different from most other houses in the fashionable parts of the West End, but this is deceptive. The windows were more widely spaced than most, the ceilings were high, and deep plots and ingenious planning allowed some of the houses to contain a very large amount of accommodation indeed (see the plans in the Survey of London extract linked below and note that this is not reflected in the extract from Horwood's map shown as he had no access to the interiors). Some of the houses had fine interiors by leading architects such as Matthew Brettingham, Robert Adam and John Soane.

The southern side of the square was much more modest. The plots were just sixty feet deep and an average of 22 feet wide. They originally faced Pall Mall and had Pall Mall numbers (the modern reconstructions, which are mostly offices, have fronts to both the square and the street). The residents of these houses were not eligible to be trustees of the trust which administered the square or even to use the central garden. The idea of buying them out, demolishing their houses and leaving the space open to the Pall Mall was raised more than once, but never implemented.

In 1727, an ornamental basin and fountain were constructed in the Square's centre. Although the plans for the fountain were later abandoned, and water no longer supplied by the 1730s, the basin remained until 1854, when it was removed following complaints by residents during a cholera epidemic.

Things began to change by the 1830s with the arrival of club-houses, and in 1844 The Builder commented that the square was losing caste and the fashionable were migrating to Belgravia. By 1857 the square contained a bank, an insurance society, two government offices, the London Library, two lodging-houses and three clubs. However, some of the houses continued to be occupied by the fashionable and wealthy into the twentieth century.

The Libyan embassy in St James's Square was the site of the 1984 Libyan Embassy Siege. According to a news report of the time:

A police officer has been killed and ten people injured after shots were fired from the Libyan People's Bureau in central London. WPC Yvonne Fletcher had been helping control a small demonstration outside the embassy when automatic gunfire came from outside. She received a fatal stomach wound and some of the demonstrators were also severely injured. WPC Fletcher, 25, died soon afterwards at Westminster Hospital.

== Addresses ==
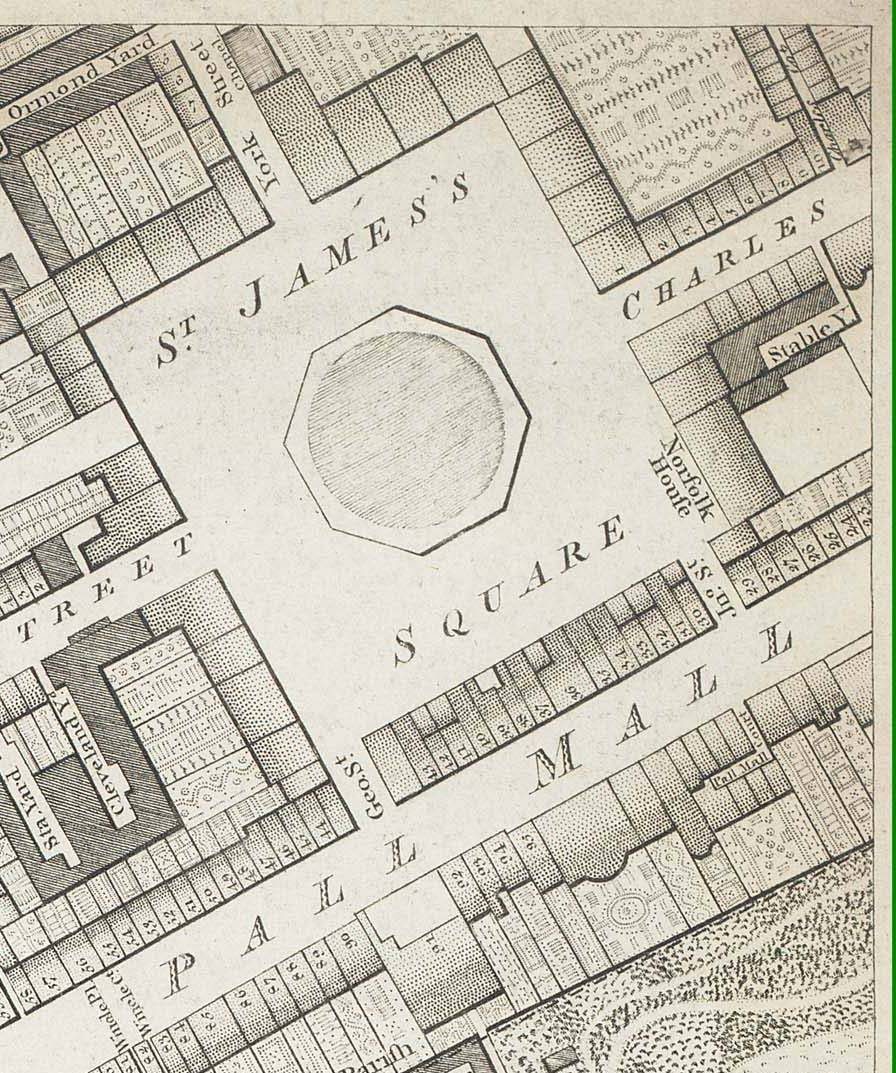
St James's Square in 1799

The numbering starts with Number 1 to the north of Charles Street (now Charles II Street) on the eastern side of the square and proceeds anti-clockwise as far as Number 21. The Army and Navy Club's clubhouse occupies the former sites of Number 22, a smaller adjacent house which may have had a George Street number, and several former houses in Pall Mall. Norfolk House at the southern end of the square is Number 31, and the two houses to its north are Numbers 32 and 33. A small house in the angle of the square south of Norfolk House, originally numbered in John Street, and the adjacent house in Pall Mall, have been combined and allocated the number 31A.

The smaller houses along the southern side had Pall Mall numbers until 1884. This block is now occupied by a mixture of 19th and 20th century buildings which are fully built up to the pavements on both sides. Some of them have their main entrance in Pall Mall and others in the square, and there are two separate sets of numbers for them. The numbers in the square range from 22A to 30, with some omissions.

- No. 1: BP head office. Also occupies the site of the former No. 2 and several demolished houses in Charles II Street. It is a post-modern building dating from c.2000 which differs from the Georgian style of the street. It was built to be Ericsson's London office and was sold to BP for £117 million in 2001.
- No. 3: The original house had many owners and tenants, including the holders of at least three separate dukedoms, and was worked on by various architects including John Soane. General Augustus Pitt-Rivers lived in the house as a child during the 1830s and 1840s. The present building is a 1930s office block.
- No. 4: The Naval and Military Club in a Georgian house of 1726–28 by Edward Shepherd. It was the London residence of the Earls Cowper for much of the 19th Century and its châtelaines included Emily, Countess Cowper and Viscountess Palmerston and Ettie Grenfell, Baroness Desborough, niece of the last Earl Cowper. It was also the former home of Nancy Astor and the only house in the square to retain its large garden and the original mews house to the rear.
- No. 5: Wentworth House, 5, St James's Square, built in 1748-51 by William Wentworth, 2nd Earl of Strafford, to the design of Matthew Brettingham The Elder 1748–9. Refronted in stone, porch added, and attic converted into a full storey in 1854. Now offices; in 1984 it was the Libyan "People's Bureau", when during the Libyan Embassy Siege gunshots fired from the building caused the murder of Yvonne Fletcher.
- No. 6: (Under Demolition) Rio Tinto Group head office. Modern. This building was the home of the Hervey family (Earls and Marquesses of Bristol) for nearly 300 years. Lord Arthur Hervey was born at the house in 1808. In the 1950s the old building was knocked down, and the family did not return.
- No. 7: Neo Georgian, architect Edwin Lutyens, 1911.
- No. 8: Neo Georgian, architects Robert Angell and Curtis, 1939. In November 2007, No. 8 and neighbouring No. 7 were bought for £125m.
- Nos. 9 to 11: Numbers 9, 10 and 11 were built in the 1730s on the site of the former Ormonde House, once the largest house in the square. Henry Flitcroft supervised number 10 and probably also numbers 9 and 11. No. 10 is Chatham House, former home of British Prime Minister William Pitt the Elder and of the Earl and Countess of Blessington. There is a London County Council plaque on Number 10 stating "Here lived Three Prime Ministers WILLIAM PITT Earl of Chatham 1708–1778 Edward Geoffrey Stanley EARL OF DERBY 1799–1869 William Ewart GLADSTONE 1809–1898".
- No. 12: Built 1836, probably by Thomas Cubitt. Former home of Ada Lovelace.
- No. 13: Built 1735–1737, possibly by Matthew Brettingham. Now houses the High Commission of the Republic of Cyprus.
- No. 14: Occupied by the London Library since 1845, rebuilt for them 1896–98 and subsequently extended to the rear.
- No. 15: Lichfield House, by James Stuart, 1764–6. Balcony added circa 1791 by Samuel Wyatt. So-called after Thomas Anson, 1st Earl of Lichfield, resident when the Lichfield House Compact was agreed there in 1835. Now offices.

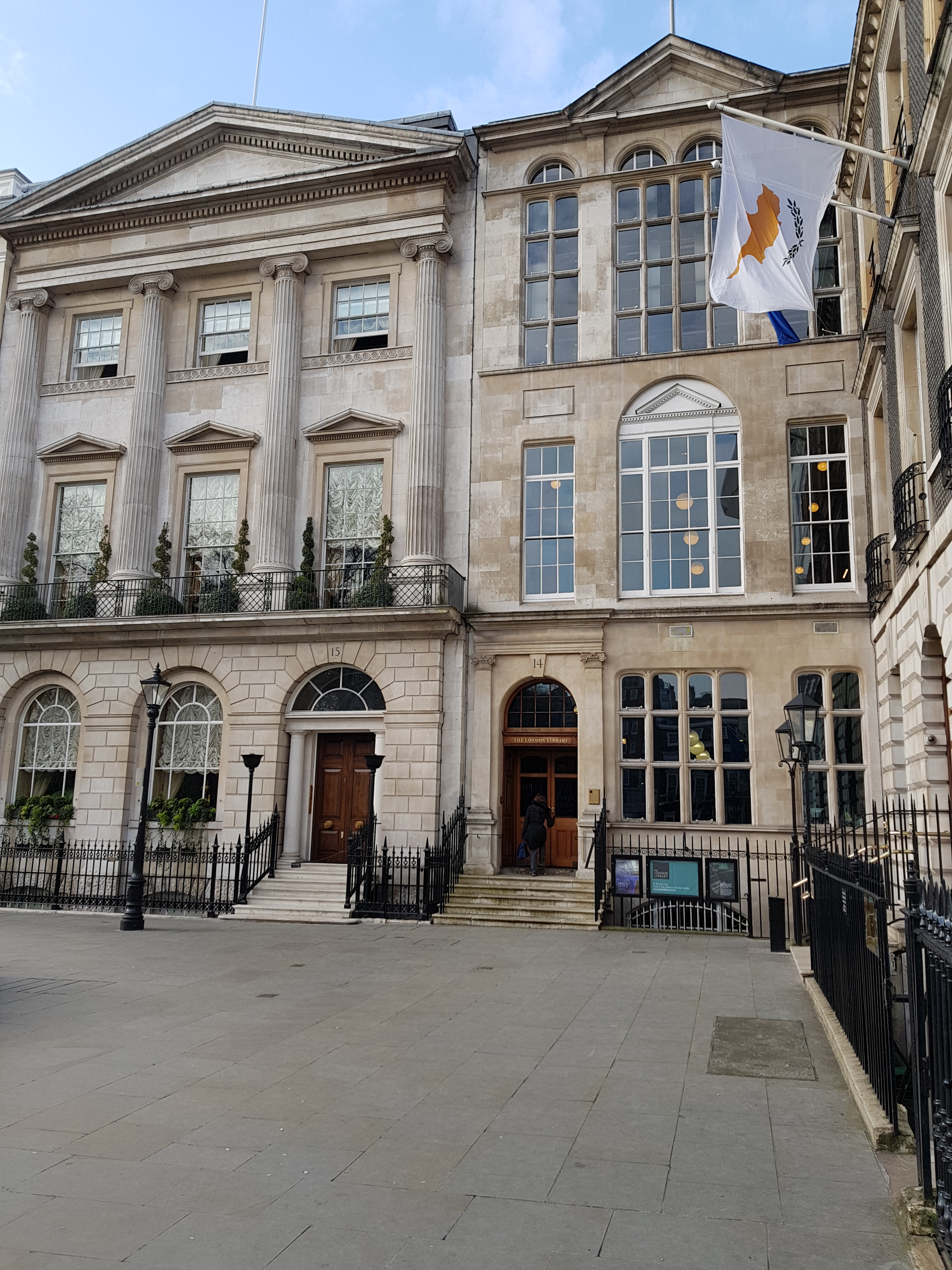
15 and 14 St James's Square

- No. 16 and site of former No. 17: East India Club, built in 1865 to designs by Charles Lee.
- No. 18: Italianate reconstruction of 1846. Now apartments.
- No. 19: The London home of the Dukes of Cleveland and family from 1720 to 1894. A replacement building of 1898–99 used variously as offices and residentially was replaced by the present stone-clad offices in 1999–2000. Current site of the Rolex UK headquarters.

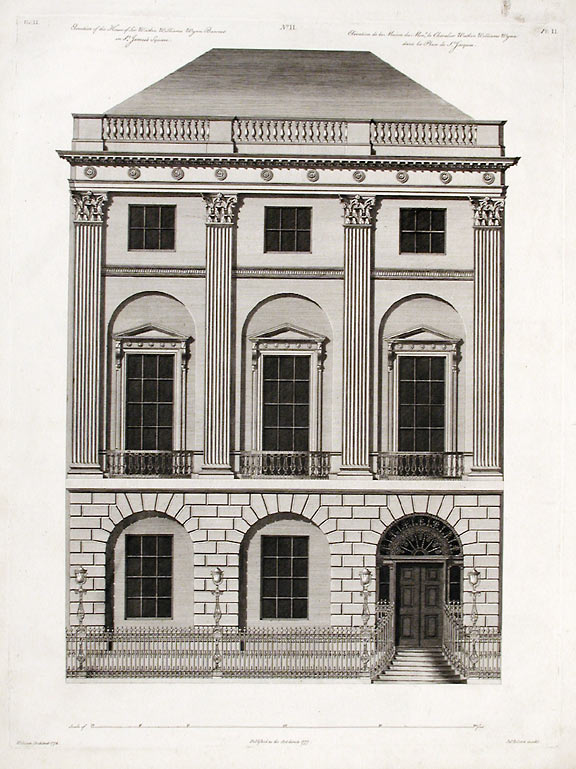
The façade of No. 20 as designed by Robert Adam.

- No. 20/21: Robert Adam's reconstruction of No. 20 for Sir Watkin Williams-Wynn from 1771 to 1775 is one of the most praised of his smaller works. The house was three bays wide and had three main storeys plus an attic. In 1936 it was extended to include the rebuilt No. 21 to its south, forming a uniform seven bay façade with an extra full storey on top. This address became the London offices for the enterprise software company Autonomy Corporation in December 2010.
- (Former) No. 22 and adjacent buildings: replaced by the Army and Navy Club 1848–51. It had a bold Venetian exterior. This has been lost and the present building is in a mean mid 20th century style.
- Nos. 22A to 30: See above. Little historical or architectural significance, except that the now defunct Junior Carlton Club once occupied a grand clubhouse at the western end of the block.
- No. 31: Norfolk House – the London residence of the Dukes of Norfolk for many generations, was built between 1748 and 1752 by Edward Howard, 9th Duke of Norfolk to the design of Matthew Brettingham "the Elder", and was demolished in 1938. It was then replaced by a neo-Georgian office building of the same name which was U.S. General Dwight D. Eisenhower's headquarters during the Second World War, where Operation Torch and Operation Overlord were planned.

London House (Rebuilding) Act 1819
- Act of Parliament
- Parliament of the United Kingdom
- Long title: An Act for assisting the rebuilding of London House, belonging to the See of London.
- Citation: 59 Geo. 3. c. 45

Dates
- Royal assent: 6 July 1819

Text of statute as originally enacted

- No. 32: Built by Samuel Pepys Cockerell and Charles Robert Cockerell in 1819–21 under the London House (Rebuilding) Act 1819 (59 Geo. 3. c. 45) as a residence for the Bishop of London, named London House. In 1851 it was one of the residences of the then Bishop of London, Charles James Blomfield. Later alterations. Used as offices.
- No. 33: By Robert Adam (1770–72) replacing an earlier house. Altered by John Soane 1817–23. Later alterations including an additional storey, but still essentially Georgian. Used as offices.
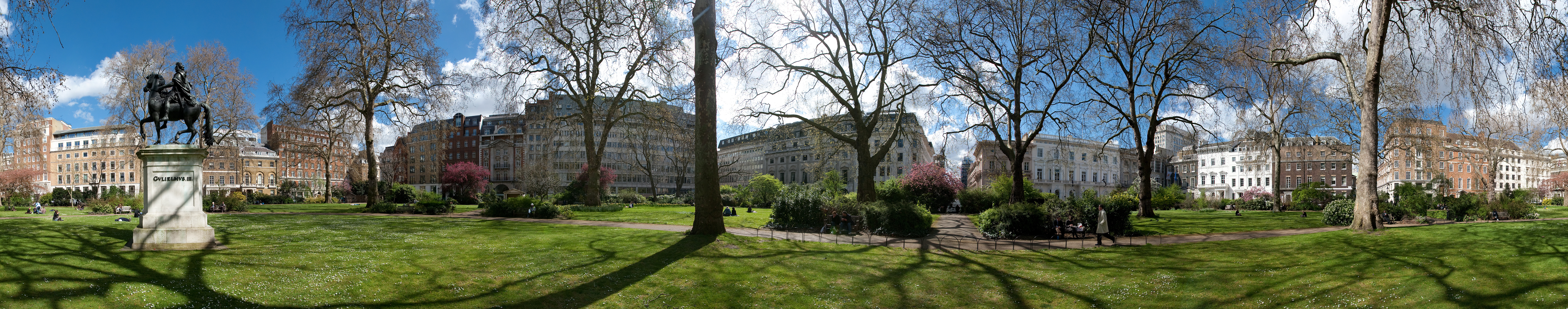
A 360-degree view of St James's Square; from left to right, east, south, west and north. (Swipe left or right)

== Gardens ==
Saint James' Square (Rates) Act 1725
- Act of Parliament
- Parliament of Great Britain
- Long title: An Act to enable the present and future Inhabitants of the East, North, and West Sides, or Lines, of St. James's Square, to make a Rate on themselves, for raising Money sufficient to clean, adorn, and beautify the said Square, and to continue the same in Repair.
- Citation: 12 Geo. 1. c. 25
- Territorial extent: Great Britain

Dates
- Royal assent: 26 April 1726
- Commencement: 20 January 1726 (Note: Start of session.)

Status: Current legislation

Text of statute as originally enacted

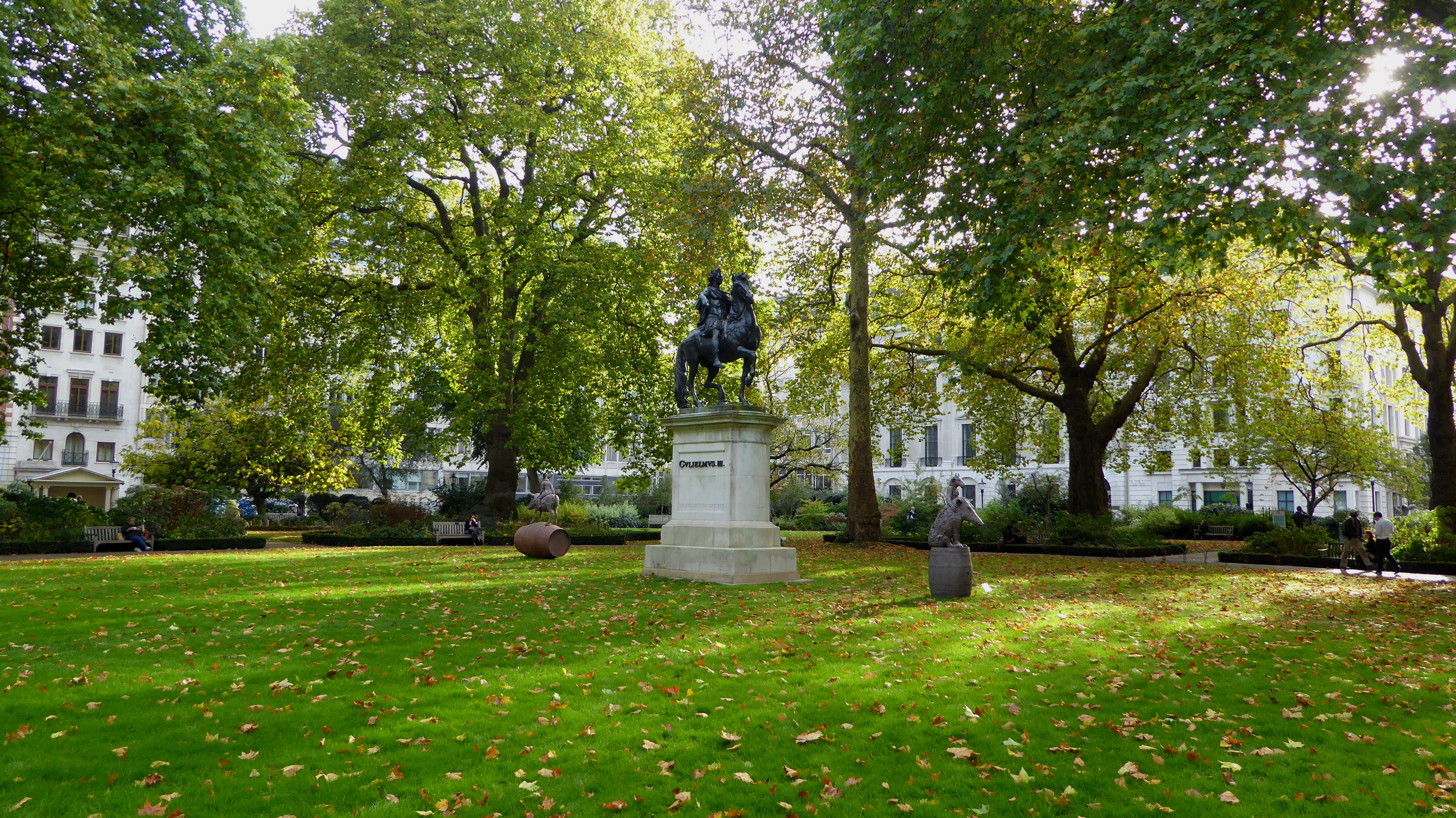
The gardens

The gardens in the centre of the square are maintained and cared for by the St James's Square Trust, which receives its financial support from the building freeholders. The trust was established by the Saint James' Square (Rates) Act 1725 (12 Geo. 1. c. 25), which authorised the freeholders to raise a rate on themselves to "clean, adorn and beautify" the square: this was the earliest statute passed to regulate a London square, and is the only one still in unamended operation. The gardens are normally open to the public on weekdays from 7.30am to 4.30pm, but are kept locked and accessible only to freeholders and residents at other times. They are used on an occasional basis as a venue for art exhibitions, weddings, and other functions.

== Other details ==
- Post code: SW1Y
- Closest Tube stops: Piccadilly Circus, Green Park

== Bibliography ==
- Details of ex-residents taken from blueplaque.com
