= Emma Marshall =

English children's author (1830–1899)

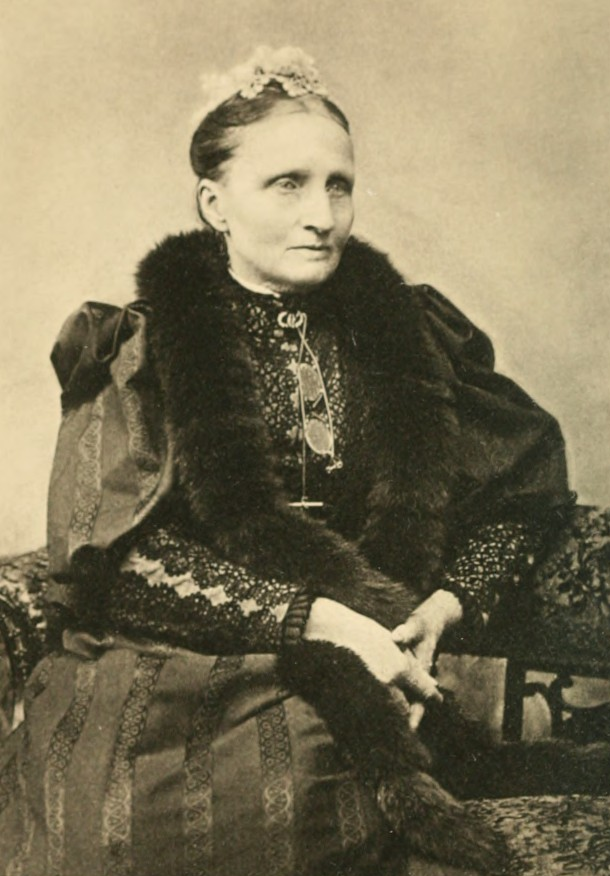
- Born: Emma Martin; 1830; Cromer, Norfolk, England
- Died: 4 May 1899 (aged 68–69); Clifton, Somerset, England
- Occupation: Children's author
- Spouse: Hugh Graham Marshall

Emma Marshall (1830–1899) was an English children's author who wrote more than 200 novels.

== Life ==
She was the youngest daughter of Simon Martin, a partner in Gurney's Norwich bank, who was married, at St Michael-at-Plea, Norwich, in 1809, Hannah (Ransome), a quakeress. She was born at Northrepps Hill House, near Cromer, in 1830. The family soon moved to Norwich. Miss Martin has depicted her early childhood very faithfully in one of her first stories, The Dawn of Life (1867). She was educated at a private school until the age of sixteen.

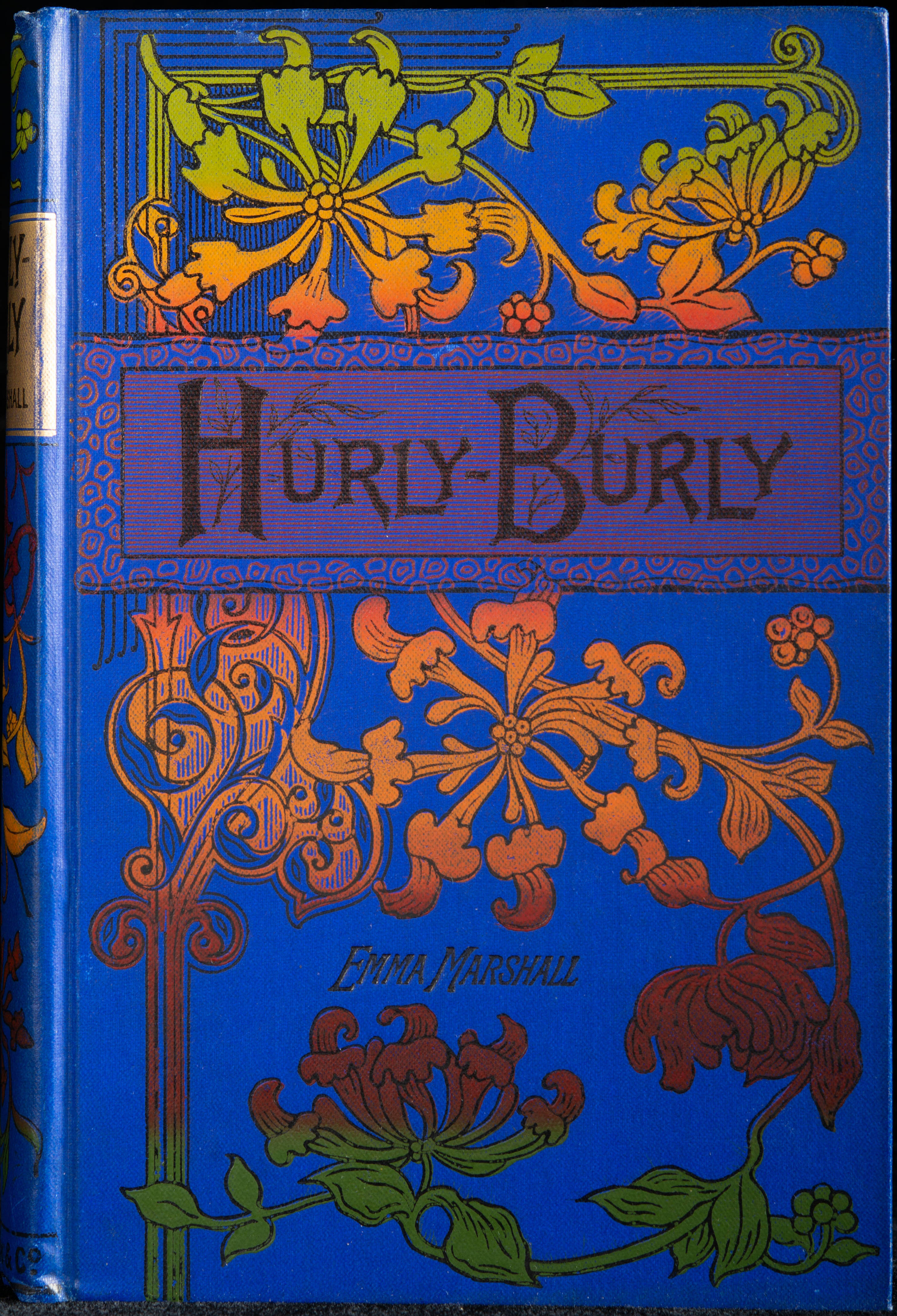
Hurly-Burly; or, After a Storm Comes a Calm 1893 book cover by Emma Marshall

The proximity of Norwich Cathedral and its precincts strongly influenced her subsequent line of thought. When as a girl she read Longfellow's Evangeline, she was very impressed with it that she wrote to the poet, and thus began a correspondence that lasted until her death. In 1849, she left Norwich with her mother to live at Clifton, Bristol, where acquaintance with Dr. Addington Symonds gave them a passport to the society of the place.

She began to write from a desire to amuse and instruct young people when she settled at Clifton. Her first story, Happy Days at Fernbank, was published in 1861. Between that date and her death, she wrote over two hundred stories. This enormous production was stimulated by heavy losses in 1878, when the failure of the West of England bank not only swept away her husband's income and position, but involved him as a shareholder in certain liabilities. These Mrs. Marshall cleared off with indefatigable courage.

Marshall died at home in Clifton on 4 May 1899 from Pneumonia, and was buried on 9 March in the cemetery of Long Ashton.

== Works ==
Her method was to pick a historic character or famous building and weave a story around it, her best selling books were Under Salisbury Spire, Penshurst Castle and Winchester Meads. Of Life's Aftermath, perhaps the most popular of her novels, thirteen thousand copies have been issued.

She had a special faculty for turning to account dim legend or historical incident, and her books generally have some celebrated historical character for the central figure round whom the story is woven; in Under Salisbury Spire (1890) it is George Herbert, in Penshurst Castle (1894) it is Sir Philip Sidney.

Her last book, The Parson's Daughter, was finished by her daughter Beatrice after her mother's death, and published in 1899.

All her tales have a high moral and religious tone.

Many have been translated; several were included in the Tauchnitz Library.

John Nichol and J. A. Symonds, among others, were warm in their praises of them.

Canon Ainger, when advocating that a memorial, which ultimately took the form of a brass, with an inscription by him, should be placed in Bristol Cathedral, spoke of 'the high and pure quality of her literary work,' and declared that her stories 'have been the means of awakening and cultivating a taste for history and literature throughout the English-speaking world.'

- Rainy Days and How to Meet Them (1862)
- Heights And Valleys (1871)
- -A Lily Among Thorns (1874)
- The Cathedral Cities of England, English Cathedrals (1879)
- Heather And Harebell (1881)
- Under the Mendips (1886)
- Oliver's Old Pictures or The Magic Circle (1888)
- Her Season in Baths (1889)
- In The City of Flowers (1889)
- Little Miss Joy (1891)
- Hurly-Burly; or, After a Storm Comes a Calm
- A Flight with the Swallows (1896)
- In The Choir of Westminster Abbey (1897)
- Eaglehurst Towers (n.d)
- Laurel Crowns (n.d.; James Nisbet & Co., 21 Berners Street)
- Dayspring.
- Little Queenie. A Story of Child Life Sixty Years Ago.
- Bluebell. A Story of Child Life To-day.
- The Children of Dean's Court; or Ladybird and Her Friends.
- A True Gentlewoman. The Story of Dame Margaret Hoby.
- The End Crowns All. A Story of Life.
- Bishop's Cranworth; or Rosamond's Lamp.
- Christopher's New Home. A Tale.
- A Little Curiosity.
- Peter's Promises; or, Look before your Leap.
- Clement and Georgie; or, "Manners Make Man".

== Family ==
In 1854, she married Hugh Graham Marshall, who was in the service of the West of England bank. The early years of her married life were spent at Wells, Exeter, and Gloucester; and Longfellow, in reference to the continual flitting from one cathedral town to another, called her 'Queen of Summer, temple-haunting Martlet.' There were three sons and four daughters of the marriage.

Emma and Hugh had nine daughters, the youngest daughter Christabel Marshall was a campaigner for women's suffrage, a playwright and author.
