= A new loyal song, upon King William's Progress into Ireland =

A new loyal song, upon King William's Progress into Ireland is an English broadside ballad believed to have been composed roughly around the 1690s. Online facsimiles of the ballad, as well as recordings of the ballad sung in its original tune, are available for public consumption. The ballad praises the future exploits William III of England will make in Ireland, specifically at the Battle of Boyne. Though the ballad is believed to have been composed around 1690, just one year after William deposed James II of England, the title of the ballad ("A new loyal song") makes clear the fact that the composer was a supporter of William and his Glorious Revolution.

== Synopsis ==
Sung to the standard tune of "Valiant Jockey's Marched Away," the ballad begins with a rather straightforward praise of William: "Now our Mighty William goes / To Ireland to Subdue His Foes." Indeed, the ballad consistently paints William III as not only a conqueror, but a liberator, a harbinger of freedom from the "Irish Rebels." The ballad also supports William's religious convictions, which were Protestant in nature, as well as his desire to rid Ireland of its deeply rooted Roman Catholic belief structure: "Rebels fly, and quit your Arms, / King Williams Name your Camp Alarms; / Now your Preists, & good St. Patricks Cross / Will both be quickly at a loss."

The ballad concludes, as many encomiums do, with the general praise of the subject and a desire for his or her continued longevity: "Heaven bless our King and Queen, / Who have our Nations safe-guard been, / Wheresoe’re They do Their Banner spread, / May Larwels Crown their Royal Head."

== Form ==
The ballad's form is uncomplicated in structure. It is broken up into six stanzas, the first two being 12 lines, followed by two 6 line stanzas, and concluding with two 12 line stanzas. It utilizes rhyming couplets with alternating iambic pentameter and iambic tetrameter metrical lines.
