= Royal Courage, King William's Happy Success in Ireland =

Song

Song
- Genre: Broadside ballad

"Royal Courage" or "King William's Happy Success in Ireland" is an English broadside ballad published by Thomas Betterton between 1682 and 1692, and is set to the tune of "Let the Soldiers Rejoice". The original copy of the ballad is available for view at the Pepys Library of Magdalene College, Cambridge. Online facsimiles of the ballad, as well as audio recordings sung to the original tune, have been made available online for public consumption.

== Synopsis ==
This ballad, known for its opening lines, "LET the soldiers rejoice, / With a general Voice, / And the Senate new Honour and Glory decree ‘em / Who at his Army’s Head, / Struck the fell Monster dead, / And so boldly, so boldly, so bravely did free ‘em," details a victory King William III of England gained in the Williamite War in Ireland. While the context of the ballad doesn't make clear which battle William is victor of, we know that it takes place before the Siege of Limerick in 1691: "Great Limerick Town, / We’ll soon batter down, / If they do not their forts and their Castles surrender, / For Providence we see, / Crowns with Victory." The ballad itself expounds on exploits performed by William III after the Glorious Revolution has taken place, since James II of England was clearly deposed by the time ballad was composed.
