= Lichfield House Compact =

1835 UK political agreement

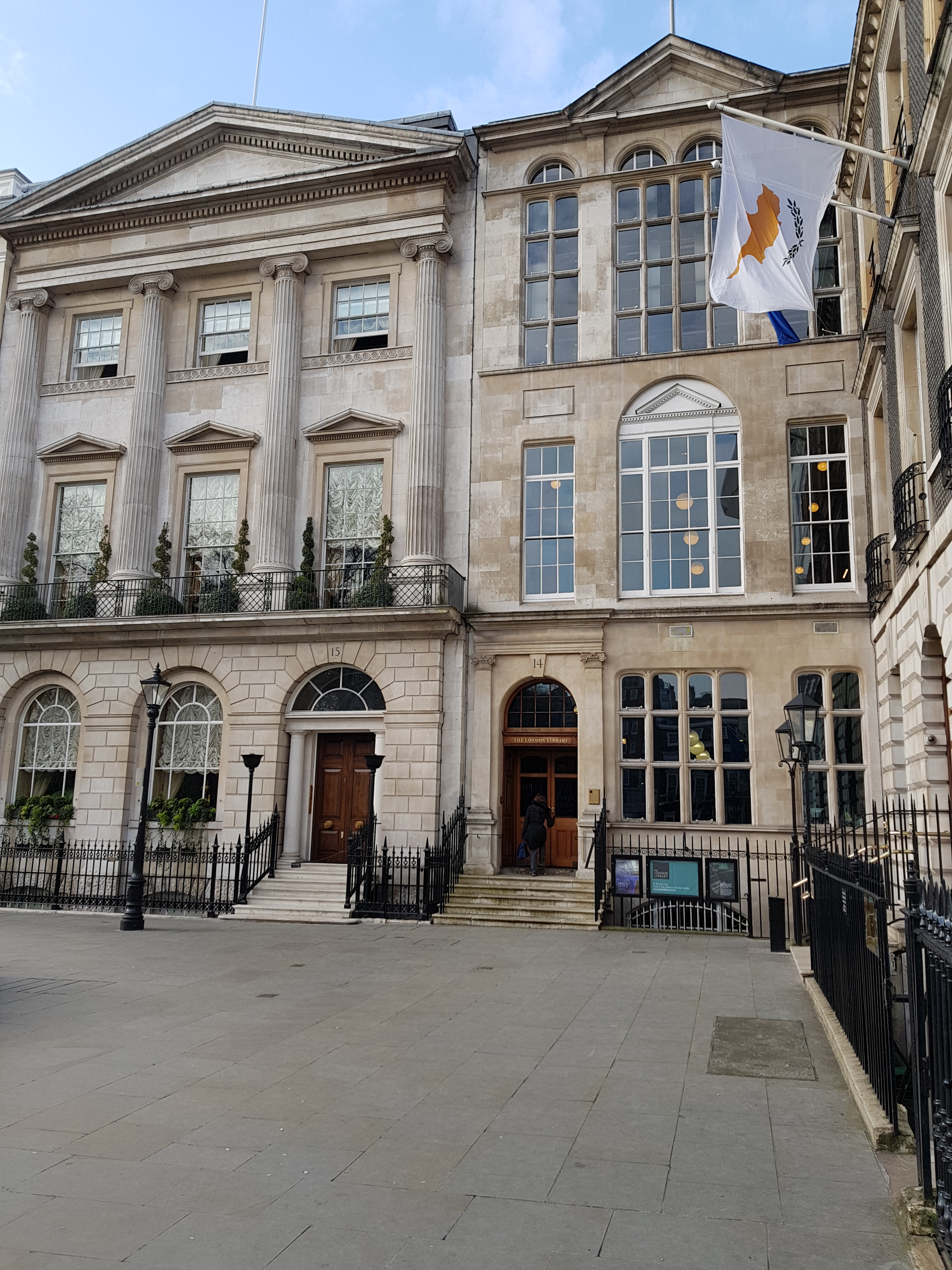
Lichfield House (left)

Map of elected candidates in the 1835 United Kingdom general election in Ireland. Yellow seats were won by Lichfield House Compact candidates.

The Lichfield House Compact was an 1835 agreement between the former Whig government, the Irish Repeal Party (led by Daniel O'Connell) and the Radicals to act as one body against the Conservative Party. It allowed O'Connell to push for further reforms for Ireland. It was signed in February 1835 in Lichfield House, St James's, residence of Thomas Anson, 1st Earl of Lichfield.

The Compact has been argued by historians such as Robert Stewart to have been the moment of formation of the Liberal Party. However, the Compact was formed in opposition to the Peelite faction, and some argue that it was the Peelites whose contribution to Liberal ideology played a dominant role in later years.

The Whigs had been in opposition after the dismissal of Prime Minister Melbourne in November 1834. The new Government, formed by Robert Peel, had decided for a dissolution followed by a general election in January 1835. The election saw a decline of the Whigs numbers, with an advance of both Tories and Radicals.

While Grey was very strongly against any cooperation with O'Connell and Melbourne was reluctant, Lord Russell was more inclined towards collaboration.

A number of supporters of Daniel O'Connell saw this agreement as a betrayal of their hopes for a repeal of the Act of Union.

Many voters saw the alliance as dangerous. However, the Whigs and their Radical and Repeal allies won a majority in the January 1835 general election, and in April their leader Lord Melbourne replaced Peel as Prime Minister.

== See also ==
- Tithe Commutation Act
