= Tithe Commutation Act =

Tithe Commutation Act may refer to:

- Tithe Commutation Act 1836 applied in England and Wales
- Tithe Commutation Act 1838 applied in Ireland
