= England's Triumph =

English broadside ballad

England's Triumph, Or, The Kingdom's Joy for the proclaiming of King William and His Royal Consort, Queen Mary, in the Throne of England, on the 13th. of this instant February. 1688, or simply England's Triumph, is an English broadside ballad composed in 1689. As the title suggests, the ballad takes as its primary focus the coronation of William III of England and his consort Mary II of England, which took place in February 1689 (even though the ballad claims it took place in 1688. This is most likely a typographical error on the part of the composer or the printer). William III and Mary II's coregency marked the end of the Glorious Revolution and the reign of James II of England. The coregency also brought about a shift in the religious paradigm of 17th-century England, which was Roman Catholic when James II sat upon the throne. Indeed, the ballad comments on the "vile pop'ry" that ruled the throne prior to the rule of William III, which saw the restoration of Protestant liberty. Extant copies of the ballad are available at Magdalene College, Cambridge in the Pepys Library. Alternatively, online facsimiles of the ballad are available online for public consumption.

== Synopsis ==
Set to the tune of "Hark the Thundering Cannons Roar," the ballad opens with an encomium directed toward King William III: "Now the Royal deed is done, / King William’s seated on the Throne, / and we his Subjects justly own, / He was our preservation." The ballad goes on to explicate what it means for England's religious state now that William III is "seated on the throne": "The Glories of our Court are clear, / Now Rome’s dark Clouds all disappear / And shall no more o’re-cast us here, / nor send their priests to fool us. ... [O]ur brave Prince William came, / Who smote the Babylonian Dame, / And brough her Tod-pole Tools to shame, / redeem’d us all from Slav’ry"

As the ballad makes clear, the ascension of William and Mary meant that Catholicism, the "Babylonian Dame" mentioned in these lines, was once again no longer the official religion of England. The ballad concludes as most encomium ballads do, which is to say with general praise of the subject: "May they all delights obtain, / Prove happy in a prosp’rous Reign, / And e’ery thing they wish for gain, / and prove to them a blessing."

== Form ==
The ballad is broken up into eight octets with varying rhyme schemes. For instance, the first stanza has an AA BB CCC B rhyme scheme while the second stanza has an AAA B CCC B rhyme scheme.
