= England's Happiness in the Crowning of William and Mary =

English broadside ballad

England's Happiness in the Crowning of William and Mary is an English broadside ballad composed in 1689 and takes as its primary focus the coronation of William III and Mary II. William and Mary's joint reign began in February 1689 when the Convention Parliament, summoned by William after his invasion of England in 1689, offered him the crown. Though this ballad never comments explicitly on William and Mary's 1689 penning of the English Bill of Rights, it nevertheless focuses heavily on one specific component of the act, namely the reestablishment of Protestant liberty, as William III and Mary II were both Protestants: "For a Protestant King and a Protestant Queen, / The like in old England long time hath not been."

== Synopsis ==
The ballad, set to the tune of "Let Caesar Live Long," celebrates the 1689 coronation of William III and Mary II. We see this adulation displayed most prominently in the ballad's refrain: "For in heart, voice, and loyalty merry we'll be, / In the Crowning of William and brave Queen Mary." Though there are variations of the refrain present in the ballad, each stanza concludes with the commemoration of the "Crowning of William and brave Queen Mary." The ballad celebrates also the subsequent abolition of Roman Catholicism that the crowning of the Protestant King and Queen was sure to bring about: "Now England, old England, still hold up thy head, / who lately by Popery long time hath been led, / [An]d let the Pope’s Actors, that plaid all their pranks, / [Be] gone in all haste, or we’l[l] cripple their shanks." Indeed, one might say that a primary theme of this ballad, other than that of a straightforward encomium, is anti-Catholicism. The stanzas are littered with pro-Protestant/anti-Catholic rhetoric. Indeed, the stanza ends by praising the reestablishment of the Protestant religion: "Then let all true Christians that lives in the lan[d] / By Protestant Interest for ever to stand, / And for good King William and Mary to pray, / In true Gospel-glory the Scepter to sway."

== Form ==
The ballad is split into 10 six-line stanzas (sestets), making the total line count 60. Each line is composed in iambic hexameter, and the author uses rhyming couplets to tie these lines together.
