= Sunday Times Rich List 2011 =

The Sunday Times Rich List 2011 is the 23rd annual survey of the wealthiest people in the United Kingdom, published by The Sunday Times on 8 May 2011. Since its earliest inception, the Rich List has been widely previewed in the UK media and extensively covered on the day of publication.

Every year since 1989, the UK national Sunday newspaper The Sunday Times (sister paper to The Times) has published a magazine supplement to the newspaper called the Sunday Times Rich List.

== Evaluation criteria ==
The list is based on an estimate of the net worth of the richest 1,000 people or families in the United Kingdom as of January of that year. Analysis encompasses measuring identifiable wealth, to include land, property, racehorses, art or significant shares in publicly quoted companies. The Sunday Times staff do not have access to personal bank accounts. Therefore, analysis excludes this financial data, along with small shareholdings in private equity portfolios. Once analysis is complete, the list is compiled by Dr Philip Beresford, with Tristian Davies serving as the executive editor.

In addition to the main list, smaller lists are compiled based on miscellaneous sets of criteria. These criteria include the source of their wealth, ethnicity, gender, aristocracy, profession, region, land value, charitable giving, age, and astrological signs. A separate section lists the 250 richest Irish, including both Northern Ireland and the Republic of Ireland.

== Notable changes ==
The highest new entries to the Rich List in 2011 were Gopi and Sri Hinduja, whose share of their family business was estimated at £6 billion. Another high ranked new entrant was Ravi Ruia of India's Essar with a fortune estimated at £4.9 billion, placing him 12th. The highest new entry among the women was China's Xiuli Hawken, wife of a London teacher, with an estimated property fortune of £1.066 billion.

== Top 12 fortunes ==
2011		Name	Citizenship	Source of wealth	2010	
Rank	Net worth £ bn	Name	Citizenship	Source of wealth	Rank	Net worth £ bn
1	£17.50 ▼	Lakshmi Mittal and family	India	Steel, co-owner of QPR FC	1	£22.45
2 ▲	£12.40 ▲	Alisher Usmanov	Russia	Steel, mining and co-owner of Arsenal FC	6	£4.70
3 ▼	£10.00 ▲	Roman Abramovich	Russia	Oil, industry, owner of Chelsea FC	2	£7.40
4 ▼	£7.00 ▲	The Duke of Westminster	United Kingdom	Inheritance, land, property	3	£6.70
5 ▼	£6.80 ▲	Ernesto and Kirsty Bertarelli	Switzerland & United Kingdom	Pharmaceuticals	4	£5.95
6 ▲	£6.24 ▲	Leonard Blavatnik	United States	Industry	15	£3.00
7 ▲	£6.20 ▲	John Fredriksen and family	Cyprus	Shipping	16	£2.75
8 ▼	£6.18 ▲	David and Simon Reuben	United Kingdom	Property	5	£5.53
9	£6.00 ▲	Gopi and Sri Hinduja	India	Industry and finance	n/a	unlisted
9 ▼	£6.00 ▲	Galen Weston, George Weston and family	Canada	Retailing (George Weston Limited)	7	£4.50
11▼	£5.40 ▲	Charlene de Carvalho-Heineken and Michel Carvalho	Netherlands	Inheritance, banking, brewing (Heineken)	8	£5.53
12	£4.90	Ravi Ruia	India	Energy (Essar Group)	n/a	unlisted

== See also ==
- Forbes list of billionaires
