= Andrey Goncharenko =

Russian businessman

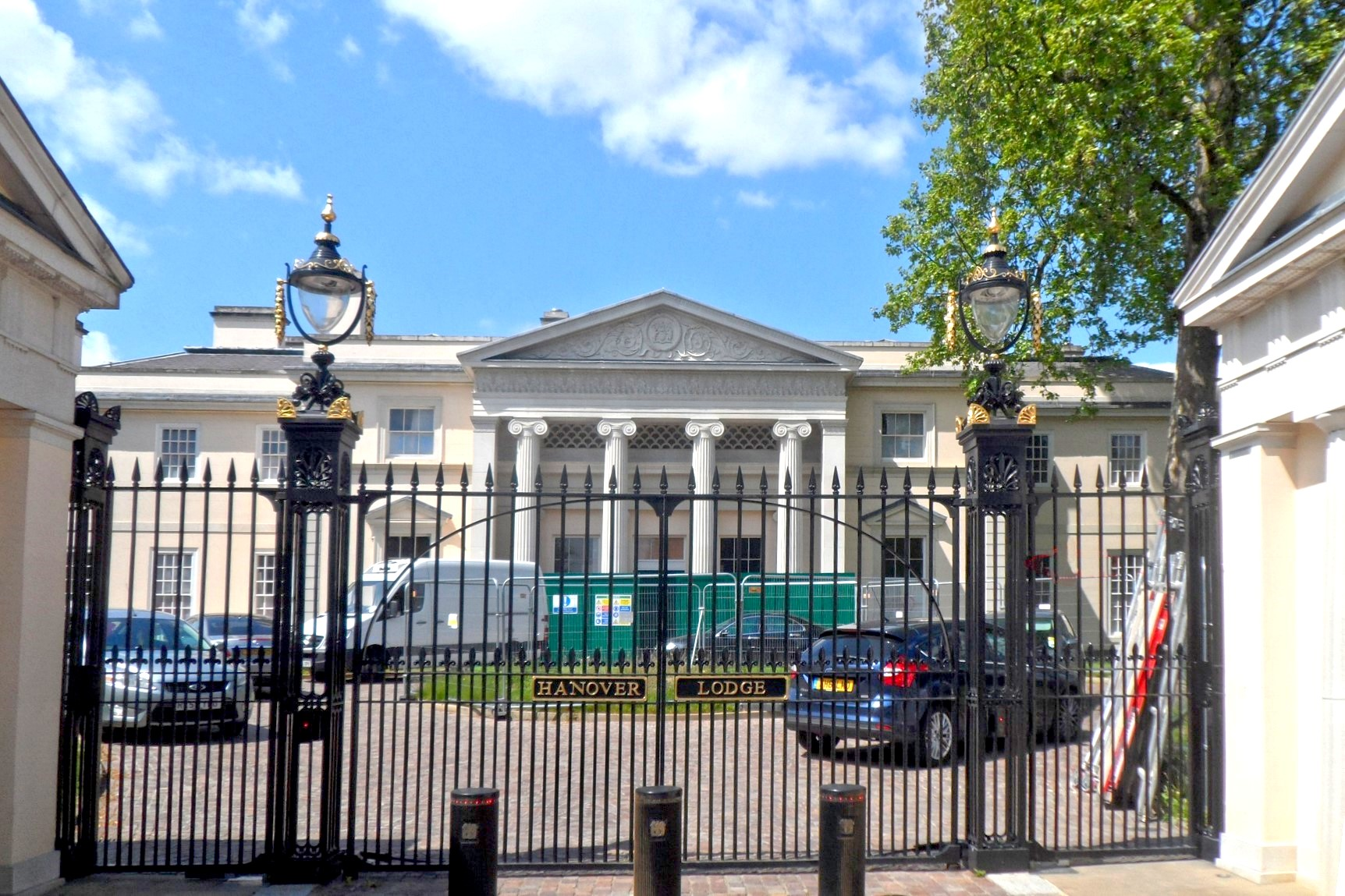
Hanover Lodge, Regent's Park, London

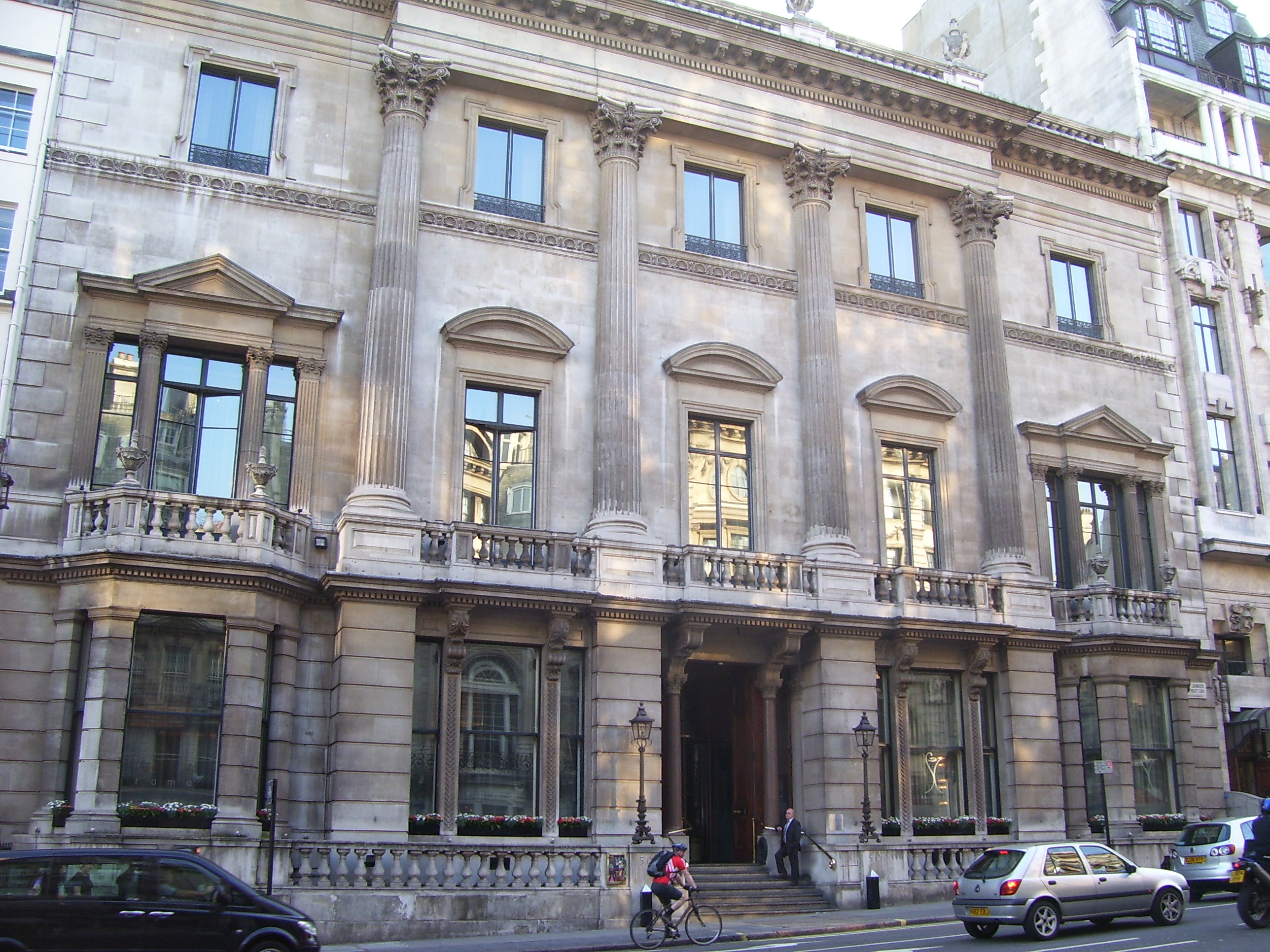
50 St James's Street

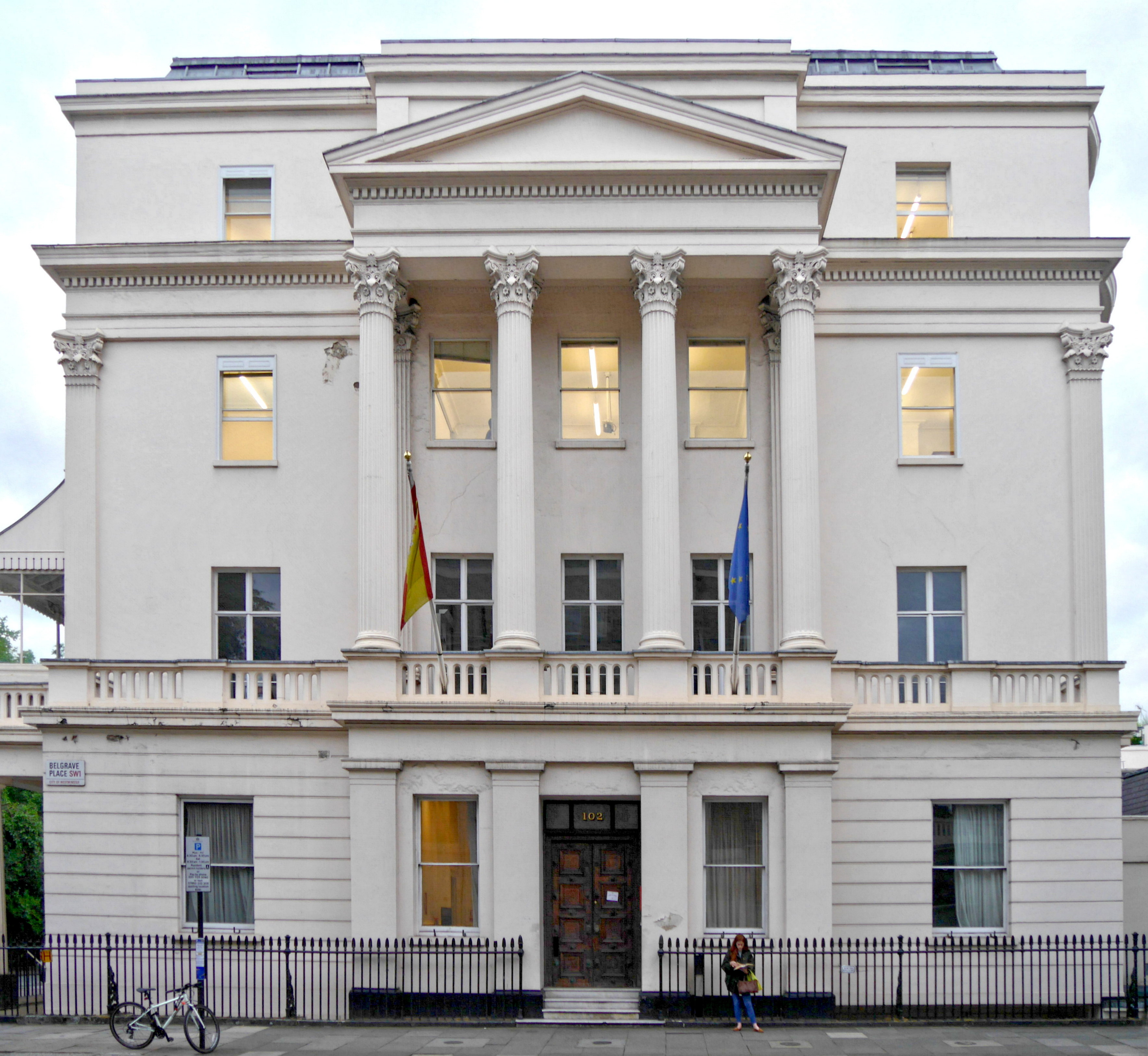
102 Eaton Square

Andrey Nikolaevich Goncharenko (Russian: Андрей Николаевич Гончаренко) is a Russian billionaire businessman, the former CEO of a Gazprom subsidiary, and the owner of four central London houses bought for a total of £250 million, including Hanover Lodge, "the UK’s most expensive home", for £120 million.

== Career ==
In the 1990s, Goncharenko acquired wealth through his involvement in the Russian property, forestry and haulage sectors, before later becoming the chairman of part of Gazprom, the state-owned energy company.

Goncharenko is the chief executive (CEO) of Gazprom Invest Yug, a subsidiary of Gazprom, Russia's largest gas company. Gazprom Invest Yug builds gas pipelines and other gas transport networks.

== London property ==
Goncharenko is the owner of four houses in central London, acquired at a cost of about £250 million over a three-year period.

In 2012, Goncharenko bought Hanover Lodge, "the UK’s most expensive home", for £120 million from the Conservative peer Lord Bagri. Goncharenko has made a series of planning applications to "further enlarge the basement and to remodel the interior" of the 26,000 sq ft Hanover Lodge. The basement extension would include a new larger pool, sauna and steam room, gym, beauty salon, yoga studio, two massage rooms, a cinema, wine cellar and games room. Above ground, "much of the work appears to involve ripping out large swathes of expensive décor only recently installed by Lord Bagri, including intricate cornicing, decorative wall-frieze paintings and timber and marble floors".

In July 2023, it became known that Goncharenko had sold Hanover Lodge to Indian billionaire Ravi Ruia for £113 million.

As well as Hanover Lodge, he bought 50 St James's Street, Mayfair for £70 million, a mansion on Lyndhurst Road, Hampstead, for £41 million, and 102 Eaton Square, Belgravia for £15 million. The redevelopment of 50 St James's Street, built in 1827 as Crockford's, a gentleman's club, and from 1874 to 1976, the Devonshire Club. In 2011, Westminster City Council approved plans to create a members' club, spa, 14-bed hotel, and two public restaurants. The building can now accommodate 800 people over five different spaces. In January 2017, squatters from the Autonomous Nation of Anarchist Libertarians (ANAL) occupied 102 Eaton Square, which had been empty, and opened it as a "homeless shelter".

== See also ==
- Quinlan Terry's Regent's Park villas
