= Raj Bagri, Baron Bagri =

Indian-British businessman and politician (1930-2017)

The Right Honourable The Lord Bagri CBE

Member of the House of Lords
- Lord Temporal
- Life peerage 14 February 1997 – 6 July 2010

Personal details
- Born: 24 August 1930 Kolkata, Bengal Presidency, British India
- Died: 26 April 2017 (aged 86) London, England
- Spouse: Usha Maheshwary
- Children: 2

Raj Kumar Bagri, Baron Bagri, CBE (24 August 1930 – 26 April 2017) was an Indian-born British businessman and a Conservative member of the House of Lords from 1997 to 2010. He was made a life peer in 1997 under the title Baron Bagri, of Regent's Park in the City of Westminster.

== Early life ==
Raj Kumar Bagri was born on 24 August 1930 in Calcutta (now Kolkata) into a middle-class family. His father died when he was three, and age 15, his mother sent him to work as a clerk at for a metal distributor, part of the Binani family's industrial empire.

== Career ==
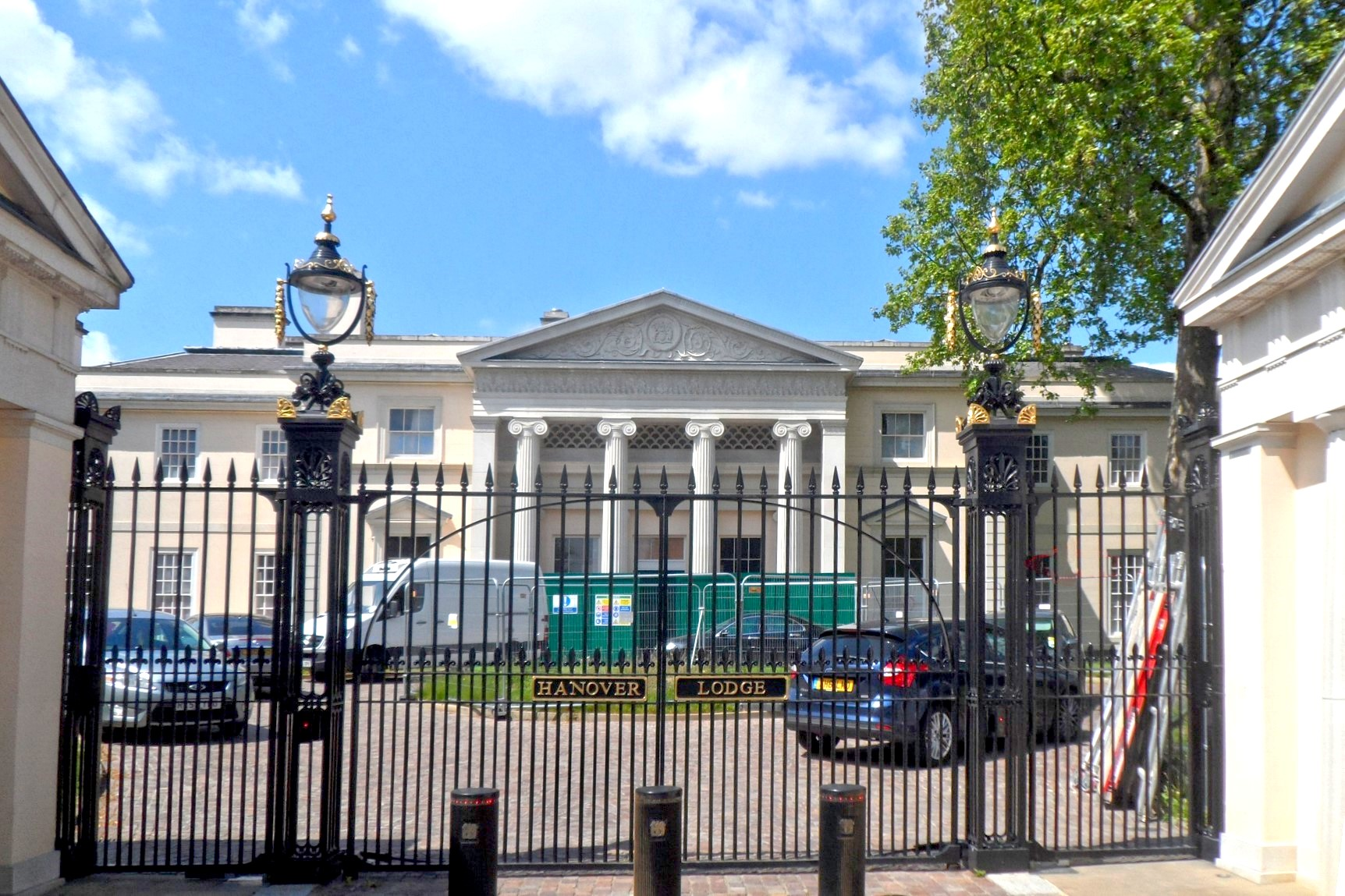
Hanover Lodge, Regent's Park, London

A businessman, Bagri was chairman of the London Metal Exchange until 2002. Bagri was a member of the advisory committee of The Prince's Trust and chairman of the Bagri Foundation. He was a governor of the University of London's School of Oriental and African Studies (SOAS).

In 2012, Bagri sold Hanover Lodge, "the UK’s most expensive home", to Andrey Goncharenko a Russian billionaire, for £120 million.

== Personal life ==
He was born in a Maheshwari Banias (traders) caste in Bagri tribe of India. He married Usha Maheshwary in 1954, and they had two children.

Bagri died in London on 26 April 2017.

== Honours and arms ==
=== Honours ===
He was to the Order of the British Empire as a Commander (CBE) in the 1995 New Year Honours. The 1997 New Year Honours list announced that Bagri was to be raised to the peerage, and in February he was gazetted a life peer as Baron Bagri, of Regent's Park in the City of Westminster. In 2010, following the enactment of the Constitutional Reform and Governance Act, Bagri gave up his seat in the House of Lords in order to maintain his non-domiciled status for United Kingdom tax purposes.

=== Coat of arms ===
Coat of arms of Raj Bagri, Baron Bagri
Coronet A Coronet of a Baron Crest Issuing from a Demi Kalasa Sable garnished Or a Lotus Flower also Or Escutcheon Per pale sable and gules six swordblades six swordblades three bend sinister issuant from the dexter three bendwise issuant from the sinister their points crossing in saltire or Supporters On either side an Elephant, the dexter Gules with Housings on the back and forehead Sable garnished tasselled and fringed Or the sinister Sable with like Housings Gules garnished tasselled and fringed Or each semy of Cinquefoils tusked and unguled Argent the tusks banded Or and holding aloft with the trunk a Lotus Flower slipped also Or Motto "Truth always triumphs" Badge Three Lotus Flowers in pairle slips outwards and conjoined to the Fimbriation Or of a Roundel Gules
