= Essar Hypermart =

Indian steel retail chain

- Type: Private
- Industry: Retailing
- Founded: 2006
- Headquarters: Mumbai, India
- Area served: Worldwide
- Key people: Vikram Amin Executive director (sales & marketing), Essar Steel Darshan Satghar Business Head - Essar eHypermart
- Products: Hot rolled steel, Cold rolled steel, Galvanised plain, Galvanised Corrugated sheets, Chequered plates, Shot blasted plates, Heavy plates, Colour coated steel TMT bars
- Revenue: ₹3,600 crore (US$370 million) (2011)
- Parent: Essar Group
- Website: www.essarhypermart.in

Essar Hypermart is a steel retail chain headquartered at Mumbai, India. It has a steel retailing network of 520 outlets. Essar Hypermart is a part of the multinational conglomerate, the Essar Group.

== History ==
The company was an initiative of Essar Steel, a 14 MTPA steel producer and one of India's largest; to bring steel directly to SMEs and end-users. With its origins in India, Essar Steel sought to eliminate the role of intermediaries in the steel-buying process. The first Essar Hypermart opened in Gandhidham, Gujarat in 2006. Since then, its network has grown to include smaller franchisees and the 100th Essar Hypermart opened in Ranchi in 2010.

For the financial year 2009/2010, the company reported revenue of ₹3,600 crore (US$370 million).

== About Essar Hypermart ==
Essar Hypermart is a store for all steel products. It houses under a variety of steel products that cater to a variety of industry segments. Essar Hypermart is also supported by the Essar Steel processing and distribution facilities.

== Products and services ==
The Essar Hypermart portfolio includes cold-rolled steel, hot-rolled steel, galvanised plain, galvanised corrugated sheets, chequered plates, shot-blasted plates, heavy plates, colour-coated steel and TMT bars.

== Essar Group ==
Essar Hypermart is a part of the Essar Group – a multinational conglomerate in the sectors of Steel, Oil & Gas, Power, Communications, Shipping Ports & Logistics, Construction, and Mining & Minerals. With operations in more than 20 countries across five continents, the Group employs 65,000 people, with revenues of US$15 billion.
