= Eaton Square =

Square in Belgravia, London

Coordinates: 51°29′46″N 0°9′6″W

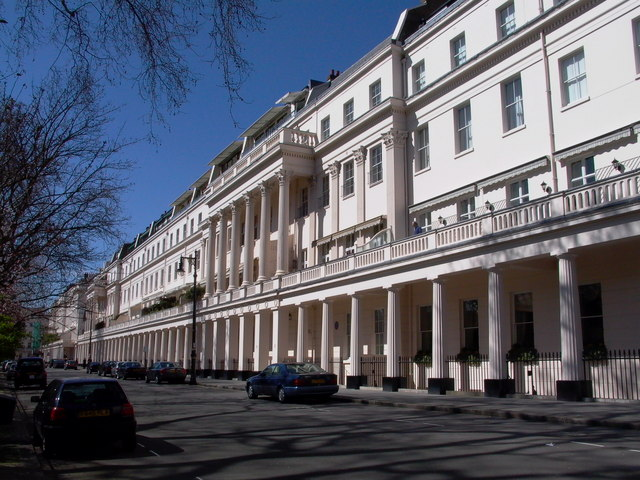
Long, white, porticoed terraces on the north side of the square.

Eaton Square is a rectangular, (Note: Its length 4.61 times its width) residential garden square in London's Belgravia district. It is the largest square in London. It is one of the three squares built by the landowning Grosvenor family when they developed the main part of Belgravia in the 19th century that are named after places in Cheshire — in this case Eaton Hall, the Grosvenor country house. It is larger but less grand than the central feature of the district, Belgrave Square, and both larger and grander than Chester Square. The first block was laid out by Thomas Cubitt from 1827. In 2016 it was named as the "Most Expensive Place to Buy Property in Britain", with a full terraced house costing on average £17 million — many of such town houses have been converted, within the same, protected structures, into upmarket apartments.

The six adjoining, tree-planted, central gardens of Eaton Square are Grade II listed on the Register of Historic Parks and Gardens. All of the buildings (No.s 1–7, 8-12A, 14–23, 24 and 24a to 48, 51–62, 63–66, Eaton House (No. 66a), 67–71, 72, 73–82, 83–102 and 103–118) are statutorily listed, specifically at Grade II* save as to 1 to 7 and 63 to 66a which are in the mainstream, initial category of grade II. No.s 103 to 105 are leased and internally converted into the Belgian Embassy, as is No. 106 for the Bolivian Embassy.

The K6 red telephone box outside No. 103 is Grade II listed.

== Overview ==
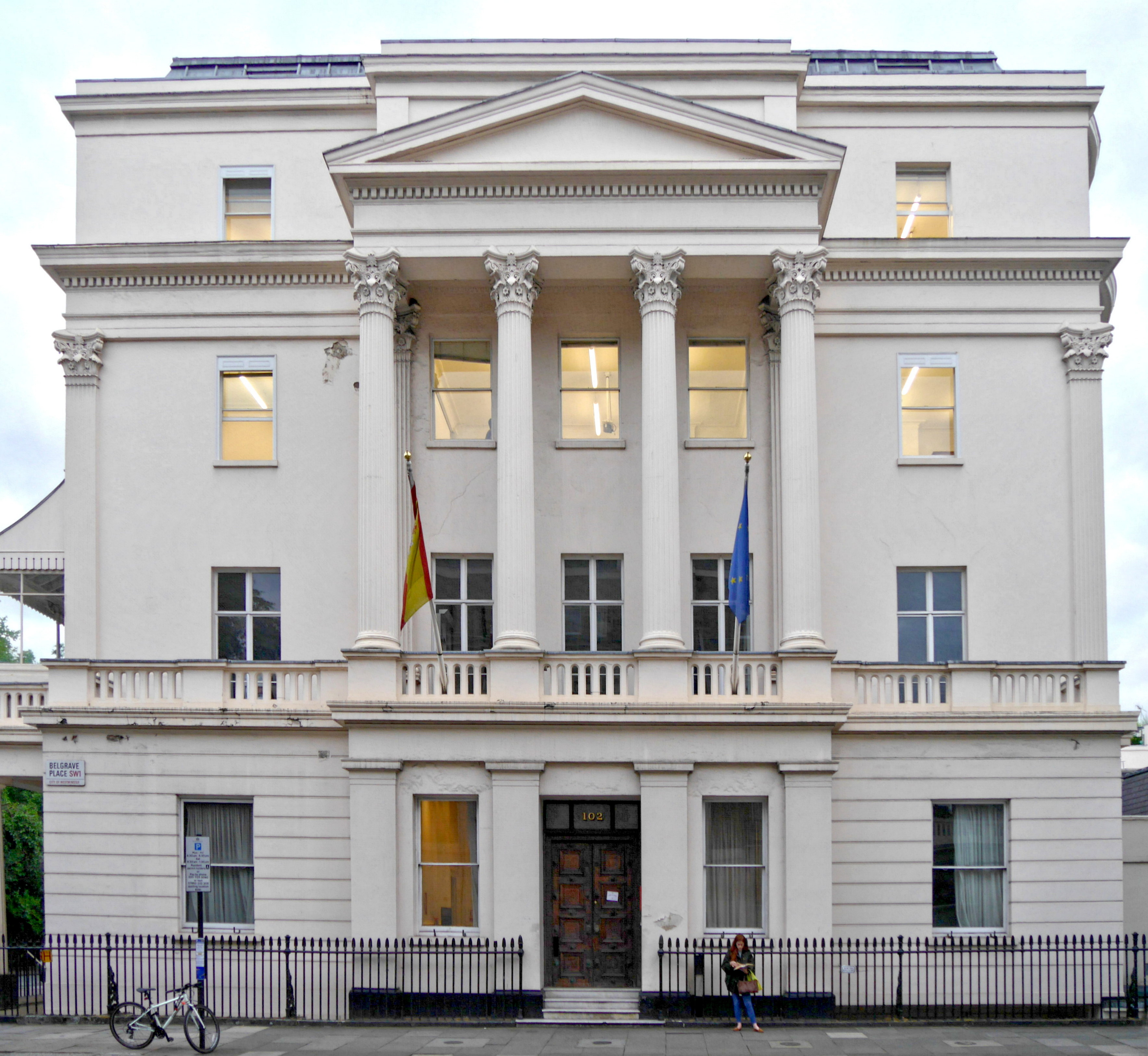
102 Eaton Square

The site was acquired by the Grosvenor family in 1677 through marriage. It was largely used as a market garden due to its marshy environment. A plan for the land was drawn up in 1825 by Thomas Cundy and the lease to the land was subsequently sold to Thomas Cubitt. Cubitt levelled the marsh land with earth excavated from his developments in St Katharine Docks. Together with Seth Smith, Cubitt would then build out the houses in the area.

The houses in Eaton Square are large, predominantly three-bay-wide buildings, joined in regular terraces in a classical style, with four or five main storeys, plus attic and basement and a mews house behind. Most of the houses are faced with white stucco, but some are faced with underlying high-quality brickwork. Sides are set 350 feet (110 m) apart 1,615 feet (492 m) apart.

As to roads: the whole rectangle is divided into six compartments or zones as it is bisected lengthways by the Victoria or Buckingham Palace approach way to the King's Road which is very diversely and briefly successively named northeast of Sloane Square). Crossways, it is spanned by four less important roads, all of which change name before, during, and after their transit across the square. All of the roads while in transit across the square assume the name Eaton Square and most of them are one-way, with no full outer circuit in any one direction permitted or possible.

In 1900, the Welsh Industrial Association held an exhibition at 83 Eaton Square, rented by the Winifred, Countess of Dundonald, the event was visited by Alexandra, Princess of Wales. The person presiding over the refreshment room exhibition was Kathleen, Duchess of Wellington, assisted by Mrs A. J. Warden, with a party of attractive ladies wearing the national costume of Wales accompanied by Ivor and Albertina Herbert of Llanover's Harpist playing for the occasion.

Between 1916 and 1917, building 87 briefly became the "Countess of Dundonald Hospital", treating many of the wounded in the Great War, George V and Queen Consort Mary of Teck visited the patients at the hospital, they were greeted by the Staff and Countess of Dundonald herself.

Before World War II, homes on the street ranked as those of the upper class but was outranked by comparators in Belgrave Square, Grosvenor Square, St James's Square or Park Lane. The aftermath of that war saw most of those converted to commercial and institutional uses, leaving the square almost wholly residential, raising its prominence. Some of the houses remain undivided but many have been internally converted into flats or multi-storey instances (maisonettes) by permission or instruction of the Grosvenor Estate. These are often lateral conversions – that is, they cut across more than one of the original houses – let under typical long leases across the uppermost price bracket, their exact price depending on size, lease duration and amenity. The façades of the square remain as imagined and built. Most but not all of the freeholds still belong to the Grosvenor Group. Hugh Grosvenor, 7th Duke of Westminster, who inherited the Duke of Westminster title from his father Gerald Grosvenor in 2016, uses one as his London home. Until the 1920s, his predecessors lived in Grosvenor House the mansion forerunner to the Grosvenor House Hotel on Park Lane facing Hyde Park.

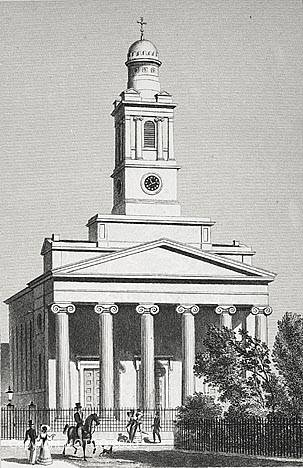
St Peter's Church, Eaton Square

Co-fronting the north-east end is St Peter's, a 200-feet-long, tree-lined Church of England church, in a classical style, fronted by a six-columned Ionic portico behind which is a slender clock tower. It was designed by Henry Hakewill and built between 1824 and 1827 (during the square's building).

Between 1940 and 1944 the Belgian government in exile occupied its three numbers which have been long used as that country's embassy in Britain and further premises in central London as their lesser homes and offices.

== Fictional references ==
Eaton Square

- Adam Verver and his wife, the former Charlotte Stant live at the square in the last complete major novel by Henry James, The Golden Bowl. (Note: The Golden Bowl begins with Volume One, Book Three, Chapter Four.)
- In the original newspaper piece that was expanded into Gilbert and Sullivan's Trial by Jury, the judge invites the rest of the cast to his house in "Five hundred and eleven, Eaton Square" for the wedding breakfast.
- In Angela Carter's last novel, Wise Children, Eaton Square is visited by Peregrine Hazard after returning by cab from the beach.
- In Anthony Trollope's novel The Bertrams Sir Henry Harcourt and his unhappy bride Lady Harcourt (Caroline Waddington) take a house in the square after their marriage.
- In Jeffrey Archer's First Among Equals, Hon. Charles Gurney Seymour, future cabinet minister and son of the Earl of Bridgwater, and his wife Lady Fiona, daughter of the Duke of Falkirk, live in Eaton Square.
- BBC 1938 radio series Send for Paul Temple bases him in the street; readers find him at flat "№26A" in novelization Paul Temple and the Tyler Mystery; also given as 127A in Paul Temple and the Tyler Mystery
- Lady Rosamund Painswick lives at the square in Downton Abbey.
- The address 48 Eaton Square is at the centre of the intrigue at the end of Season 1, Episode 2 of The Capture.

Eaton Place

The Bellamy family of Upstairs, Downstairs lived in "165" Eaton Place, one of the grand approach ways.

== Notable residents ==
- No. 1: Lewis Pelly - British East India Company officer, imperial army and political officer, Conservative MP, Lord Boothby – parliamentarian, political commentator and friend of Ronnie Kray
- No. 2: Diana Mitford, Lady Mosley
- No. 22: One of the childhood homes of John Bingham, 7th Earl of Lucan, commonly “Lord Lucan”, who was suspected of murdering his children’s Nanny, Sandra Rivett, on 7 November 1974.
- No. 36: Ruth Roche, Baroness Fermoy – long-time confidante of Queen Elizabeth, the Queen Mother and grandmother of Diana, Princess of Wales
- No. 37: Neville Chamberlain – British Prime Minister
- No. 37: Joachim von Ribbentrop – German Ambassador to London
- No. 39: Lady Aline Caroline Cholmondeley, daughter of George Cholmondeley, 5th Marquess of Cholmondeley and Sybil Cholmondeley, Marchioness of Cholmondeley. She died on 30 June 2015 at age 98.
- No. 42: Peter Thorneycroft – British Chancellor of the Exchequer
- No. 44: Prince Metternich – Austrian statesman
- No. 45: George Tryon – British Admiral who died in the sinking of HMS Victoria in 1893
- No. 54: Vivien Leigh – Oscar-winning actress; Luise Rainer – Oscar-winning actress
- No. 68: Thomas Campbell Robertson, British colonial administrator in India, died here in 1863; Barry Gibb of the pop group the Bee Gees, 1970.
- No. 72: Sir Robert Helpmann – actor, dancer and choreographer, mostly remembered for his role in the film Chitty Chitty Bang Bang.
- No. 75: Rex Harrison – Oscar-winning actor
- No. 80: George Peabody – American banker and philanthropist
- No. 82: Queen Wilhelmina of the Netherlands in 1940.
- No. 84: Stafford Harry Northcote, Viscount Saint Cyres – diplomat and historian
- No. 86: Lord Halifax – British Foreign Secretary
- No. 93: Stanley Baldwin – British Prime Minister
- No. 97: Sir Francis Scott Bt and Lady Scott of Great Barr (d. 1863 and 1909 respectively)
- No. 99: Admiral of the Fleet Sir John West
- No. 100: Hugh Grosvenor, 7th Duke of Westminster - freeholder of most of the square and most of the surrounding district
- No. 102: Instituto Cervantes
- No. 112: Admiral of the Fleet Sir Henry Codrington; Leo Amery - politician and minister in Churchill's wartime cabinet; and his son Julian Amery, Baron Amery of Lustleigh, Conservative MP.
- No. 114: George Baden-Powell, elder brother of Robert Baden-Powell; Harry Stuart Goodhart-Rendell – architect
- No. 106: The embassy of Bolivia
- No. 115: Admiral of the Fleet Sir George Seymour
- No. 118: Sir William Corry, Bt., of Dunraven, Co. Antrim (d. 1926)
- No. 57 Lower Belgrave St (corner of Eaton Sq.) Roman Abramovich - Russian billionaire and the main owner of Chelsea Football Club
- George Soros – Hungarian-born hedge fund manager.
- John King, Baron King of Wartnaby
- Princess Katherine of Greece and Denmark
- Alfred Robens, Baron Robens of Woldingham – politician and chairman of the National Coal Board
- Mr and Mrs Ernest Aldrich Simpson from 1958
- Sarah, Duchess of York, from 2014
- Andrew Lloyd Webber, Baron Lloyd-Webber - composer and theatre impresario; in 2024 he revealed he had had his house blessed by a priest in an attempt to displace a "poltergeist" that was haunting the property.
