= Public Schools Club =

Former London gentlemen's club

Coordinates: 51°30′20.01″N 0°8′44.03″W

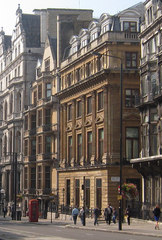
The Public Schools Club, Est. 1863, was situated at 100 Piccadilly (above) from the late 1930s

The Public Schools Club is a former London gentlemen's club.

The Public Schools Club was founded in October 1863 at 17 St James's Place, London. As outlined in the British journal The Athenaeum, from its foundation, the club restricted its membership to former pupils of Charterhouse School, Eton College, Harrow School, Rugby School, Shrewsbury School, Oundle School, Westminster School and Winchester College.

By 1885, a "Public Schools Club" was advertising for "suitable premises" in London in which to re-establish their establishment.

The club was re-founded in 1909, based at number 13 Albemarle Street which until very recently had been the home of the Albemarle Club. The Public Schools Club disbanded during World War I as a result of the heavy casualties sustained among its membership.

By 1910, the alpine sports club which had been founded c.1905 as the Winter Sports Club by Sir Henry Lunn was incorporated as the Public Schools Alpine Sports Club and under the control of “Alpine Sports, Ltd.”. In 1910, the club advertised that it "devoted its attention to Norway as a field for winter sports". British mountaineering clubs such as the Yorkshire Ramblers' Club were interested in the activities of Sir Henry Lunn and his son Sir Arnold Lunn.

After the war the club was re-founded in 1920 in Curzon Street, Mayfair. A 1937 road-widening scheme (linked to the 1935 road alterations which necessitated demolishing half of Lansdowne House and creating the Lansdowne Club) forced the club out of its premises, and it moved to 100 Piccadilly, where it remained for the rest of its existence.

Suffering from dwindling membership, the club closed in 1972, merging with the East India Club, and moving to the East India's premises in St James's Square. However, the merger has proved to be something of a takeover, as the East India naturally had no remaining members from the long-defunct East India Company, and the Public Schools Club has imported a steady stream of members. Indeed, the East India currently claims some 40% of its members come under the 'J7' rule imported from the Public Schools Club, whereby students leaving their public school at 18 pay a £700 (as of 2024) fee in exchange for membership until the age of 25.

== See also ==
- List of London's gentlemen's clubs
