= Essar Shipping =

Indian shipping corporation for the global energy business pvt ltd

Essar Shipping Ports & Logistics Ltd
- Type: Public company
- Traded as: BSE: 500630; NSE: ESSARPORTS
- Industry: Shipping Ports; Logistics
- Founded: 1945
- Headquarters: Mumbai, India
- Key people: Shashi Ruia (Chairman); Prakash Tulsiani (CEO)
- Revenue: ₹12.15 billion (US$130 million) (2010-2011)
- Parent: Essar Group
- Website: essar.com

Essar Shipping Ltd., now Essar Shipping Ports & Logistics Limited, is an Indian shipping corporation for the global energy business. Established in 1945, Essar Shipping was formally incorporated in 2010 and is listed on the Bombay Stock Exchange. Headquartered in Mumbai, it operates as a subsidiary of the Essar Group.

The company's fleet handles a daily average of eight million barrels of crude oil, 320,000 barrels of petroleum products and 355,000 tons of dry bulk cargo. The company currently has a fleet of 26 vessels, with an additional 12 new ships on order. It provides contract drilling services to global oil majors, with a fleet of 13 onshore rigs and one semi-submersible offshore rig; two new jack-up rigs on order. Essar Shipping Ports & Logistics Ltd was the first Indian shipping company to obtain the International Safety Management Code (ISM) in 1995 and is also ISO 14001 certified. The company has proposed to maximise the fleet in 2017-18 by adding new VLCCs & ULCCs.

== Operations ==
=== Ports and terminals ===
Vadinar (Gujarat, India): A 37 million ton port and terminal facility to provide handling, storage and terminaling services for crude oil and petroleum products to refineries and traders.

=== Logistics ===
It provides end-to-end logistics services – from ships to ports, lighterage services to plants, intra-plant logistics and dispatching finished products to the final customer. It owns transhipment assets to provide lighterage support services, onshore & offshore logistics services. Essar Shipping manages a fleet of 4,200 trucks for inland transportation of steel and petroleum products.

- Essar Shipping owns transhipment assets to provide lighterage support services, onshore & offshore logistics services
- Essar Shipping manages a fleet of 4,200 trucks for inland transportation of steel and petroleum product

=== Oilfields services (OGDSL - Oil & Gas Drilling Services Limited) ===
Essar Shipping provides contract drilling and Integrated Project Management services to oil and gas companies worldwide, operating both offshore and onshore in a multitude of countries.

- Owns a fleet of 14 rigs, which includes 1 semi-submersible rig and 13 onshore rigs

=== Under execution ===
- Sea transportation: On order book of 4 new building vessels
- Oilfields services: New On shore drilling contract in Gabon to begin shortly. Beating its own records of highest commercial speed with new added Schramm Rigs deployed with ONGC CBM

== See also ==
- Essar Group
- Shipping Corporation of India
