= William Crockford =

English Regency entrepreneur (1776 - 1844)

- Born: 13 January 1776; Temple Bar, London, England
- Died: 24 May 1844 (aged 68); Westminster, London, England
- Known for: Owner of Crockford's
- Spouse(s): Mary Lockwood (m. 1801) Sarah Douglass (m. 1812)
- Children: 3+

William Crockford (13 January 1776 – 24 May 1844) was an English Regency entrepreneur; horse racing enthusiast and proprietor of the infamous gambling club Crockford's who became one of the richest men in England.

== Life ==
Crockford was born 13 January 1776 in Temple Bar, London, the son of a fishmonger, and for some time himself carried on that business. He married firstly (1801) Mary Lockwood and secondly (20 May 1812 St George's Hanover Square) Sarah Frances Douglass. After winning a large sum of money (according to one story, £100,000) either at cards or by running a gambling establishment, he built a luxurious gambling house designed by Benjamin and Philip Wyatt at 50-53 St James's Street in 1827. In order to ensure exclusiveness, he organised the house as a members' club under the name "The St James's Club" though popularly known as "Crockford's Club" and it quickly became the rage – every English social celebrity and every distinguished foreigner visiting London hastened to become a member. Even the Duke of Wellington joined, though it is alleged this was in order merely to blackball his son, Lord Douro, should he seek election. Hazard was the favourite game, and very large sums changed hands.

Crockford retired in 1840, when, in the expressive language of Captain Rees Howell Gronow, he had "won the whole of the ready money of the then existing generation." He took approximately £1,200,000 out of the club, but subsequently invested some of it unwisely, particularly with two of his sons and one daughter (Henry, Charles and Fanny Crockford) in mining and zinc manufacturing in Greenfield, Flintshire, Wales.

== Death ==
Crockford died at his home 11 Carlton House Terrace (later Prime Minister Gladstone's home) on 24 May 1844. and lies buried in a family vault underneath Kensal Green Cemetery Chapel London.

== Bibliography ==
- John Timbs Club Life of London (London 1866)
- R.H.Gronow Celebrities of London and Paris, 3rd series (London 1865)
- Henry Waddy "The Devonshire Club and Crockford's" (Nash 1919)
- Frank Siltzer "Newmarket its Sport and Personalities" (Cassell 1923)
- Rupert Mackeson "Bet Like a Man" (Eye 2001)
- Harold Clunn "The Face of London" (Spring Books)
- John Raymond "The Reminiscences of Captain Gronow ... 1810-60" (The Bodley Head 1964)
- Ralph Nevill "London Clubs" (Chatto & Windus 1911)
- Ralph Nevill "Romantic London" (Cassell 1928)
- Ralph Nevill "The Man of Pleasure" (Chatto & Windus 1912)
- Jane Ridley "The Young Disraeli 1804-1846" (Sinclair-Stevenson 1995)
- St James's: a Satirical Poem in Six Epistles to Mr. Crockford" (London 1827)
- E.J.Burford "Royal St James's - being a story of kings, clubmen and courtesans" (Hale 1988)
- E.Beresford Chancellor "Memorials of St James's Street" (Grant Richards 1922)
- Henry Blyth "Hell & Hazard or William Crockford versus the Gentlemen of England" (Weidenfeld & Nicolson 1969)
- Hunter Davies "The New London Spy" (Anthony Blond)
- W.Teignmouth Shore "D'Orsay of the Complete Dandy" (Long 1911)
- Arthur Bryant "The Age of Elegance 1812-1822" (Collins 1950)
- Stella Margetson "Leisure and Pleasure in the Nineteenth Century" (Cassell 1969)
- Simon Dewes "Temple Bar Tapestry" (Rich & Cowan)
- A.L.Humphreys "Crockford's or the Goddess of Chance in St James's Street 1828-1844" (Hutchinson 1953)
- Michael Sadler "Blessington-D'Orsay - a Masquerade" (Constable 1933 & 1947)
- "Bentley's Miscellany" VolXV 1844
- "Crockford-House; A Rhapsody in Two Cantos" (Murray 1827)
- Charles Evans "The Legend of the Crockford Treasure - a play for children" (Cressrelles)
- Connery Chappell "Two pleasures For Your Choosing - the World of William Crockford" (Falcon Press 1951)
- T.H.S.Escott "The Romance of the West-End & Other Social Clubs" (Unwin 1914)
- John o'London "London Stories" (Bracken 1985 reprint of 1882 publication)
- Yves-Michel Ergal "Jeux d'Enfer" (Calmann-Levy 1992) Historical novel in French
- G.E.Mingay "Georgian London" (Batsford 1975)
- David Piper "London" (Book Club 1964)
- Harold Clunn "The Face of London" (Spring 1950s)
- Gabriel Orozco "Empty Club" (Artangel 1966)
- Tony Byles "In Search of Running Rein" (Apex 2011)
- Nicholas Foulkes "Gentlemen and Blackguards" (Phoenix 2010)
- D.J.Taylor "Derby Day" (Vintage 2011)
- John P.Birchill "Early Industrialists in Flintshire" (web)
- Rowland Tennant "A History of Holywell & Greenfield" (Bridgebooks 2007)
- J.R.Thomas "The Tramways and Railways to Holywell" (1995)
- Ken Davies "Maritime Wales No 35" (Gwynedd Council 2014)

Attribution
