= 102 Eaton Square =

Grade II* listed house in Eaton Square, Belgravia, central London

Coordinates: 51.496588°N 0.152068°W

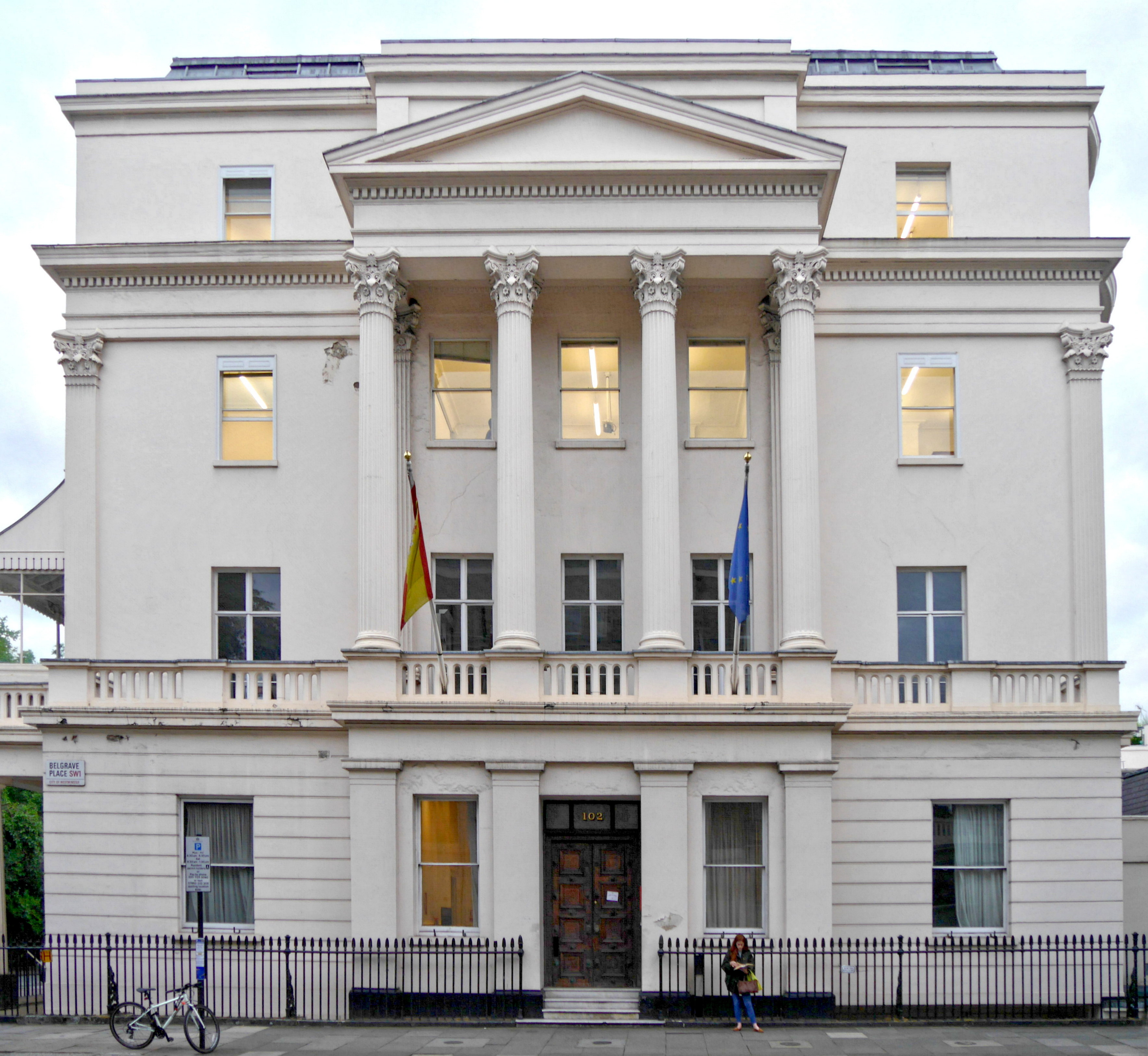
102 Eaton Square

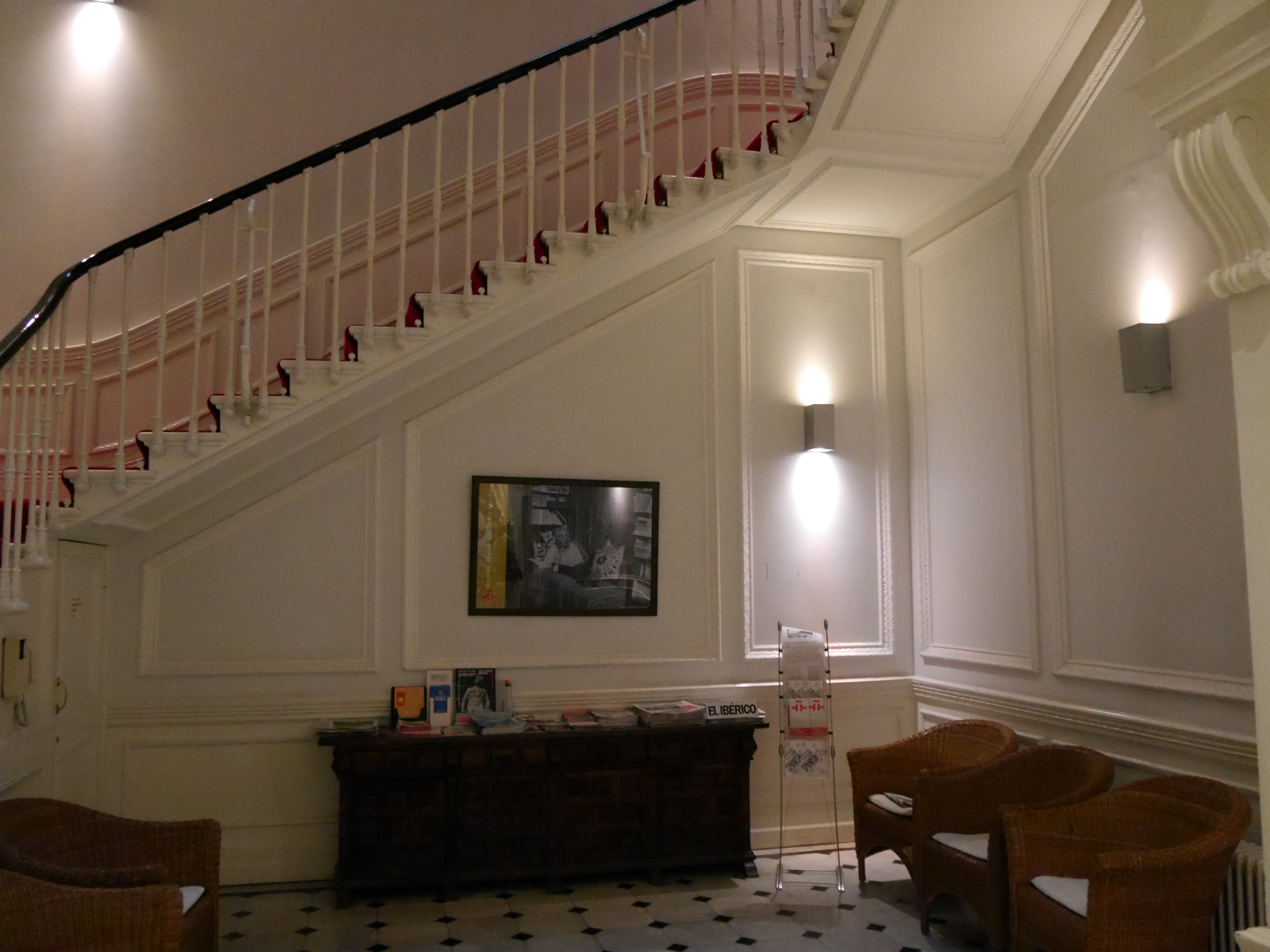
Interior, 102 Eaton Square

102 Eaton Square is a Grade II* listed house in Eaton Square, Belgravia, central London.

Until 2016, it was home to the Instituto Cervantes of London, the Spanish cultural centre, now relocated to 15–19 Devereux Court, the Strand. In July 2014, it was reported to have been bought by the Russian billionaire Andrey Goncharenko, using an offshore company, for £15 million. In January 2017, squatters from the Autonomous Nation of Anarchist Libertarians (ANAL) occupied 102 Eaton Square, which had been empty, and opened it as a "homeless shelter".
