= Binani Cement =

Cement company

Binani Cement Limited
- Logo of Binani Cement
- Company type: Public
- Traded as: BSE: 532849; NSE: BINANICEM
- Industry: Cement
- Founded: 1996; 29 years ago
- Headquarters: Mumbai, India
- Number of locations: 20
- Area served: India
- Key people: Mr. Vinod Juneja, (Managing Director)
- Revenue: ₹18,722 million (US$200 million)
- Number of employees: 10,000 + (2024)
- Parent: Binani Industries
- Subsidiaries: Shandong Binani Rong'An Cement China(SBRCC), Binani Cement Factory LLC, Dubai (BCFLLC), Krishna Holdings Pte Ltd, Mukundan Holdings Ltd, Murari Holdings Ltd and Bhumi Resources (Singapore) Pte Ltd.
- Website: Official Site

Binani Cement Limited is an Indian company engaged in the production and sales of cement and clinker, based in Mumbai. It is the flagship subsidiary of Binani Industries Ltd. The company is certified as ISO9001, ISO14001 and OHSAS18001 compliant. The company's subsidiaries include Krishna Holdings Pte Limited, Muku, Dubai (BCFLLC).

Calcutta High Court issued an order for the winding up of Binani Industries Ltd, the holding company of Binani Cement Ltd, due to its default on paying Rs5.65 crore to the advertising agency Milestone Brandcom Pvt Ltd.

== History ==
The company was incorporated on 15 January 1996 as Dynasty Dealer Private Ltd. In 1998, it was listed on BSE and changed its name to Binani Cement Ltd.
