= East India Club =

Gentlemen's club in London

Coordinates: 51°30′25.85″N 0°8′10.87″W

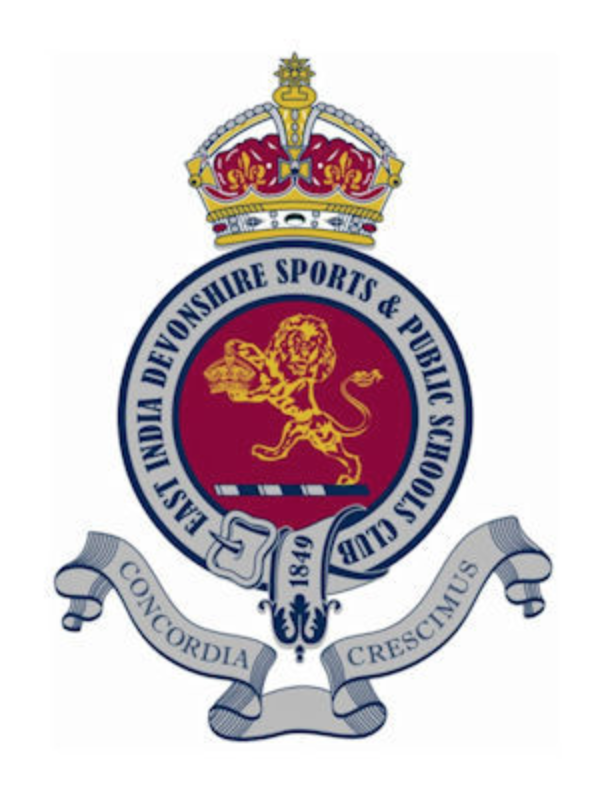

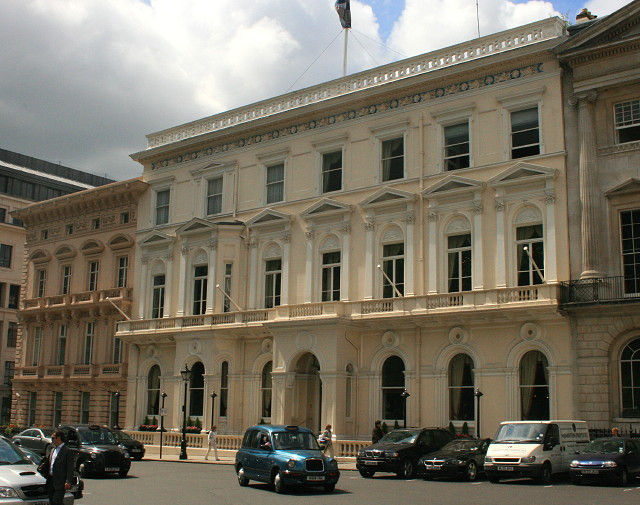
- Formation: 1849 (176 years ago)
- Type: Gentlemen's club
- Purpose: A private gentlemen's social and sporting club
- Location: 16 St James's Square, London, SW1Y 4LH
- Members: Historically Military officers of the East India Company
- Official language: English
- Website: www.eastindiaclub.co.uk

The East India Club (originally East India United Service Club) is a gentlemen's club founded in 1849 and situated at 16, St James's Square in London. The full title of the club is East India, Devonshire, Sports and Public Schools' Club due to mergers with other clubs. The club was originally founded for officers of the East India Company. Its membership has included royalty, senior military officers, politicians, diplomats and businessmen. The clubs first patron was Prince Albert.

== History ==
The club was founded in the middle of the 19th century. Its original members, as set out in the Rule Book of 1851, were:

The East India Company's servants – Clerical, Civil, Military, Naval and Medical of all the Presidencies, including those retired [and] all commissioned officers of Her Majesty's Army and Navy who have served in India, members of the Bar and Legal Profession who may have been or are Company's Advocates and Solicitors ...

But within the first eight years of the club's foundation, following the Indian Mutiny of 1857, the Government of India Act 1858 led to the British Crown assuming direct control of India in the form of the new British Raj. The company was dissolved altogether in 1874, having been rendered by then vestigial, powerless, and obsolete. As a result, the club could no longer look to the East India Company as its main source of members.

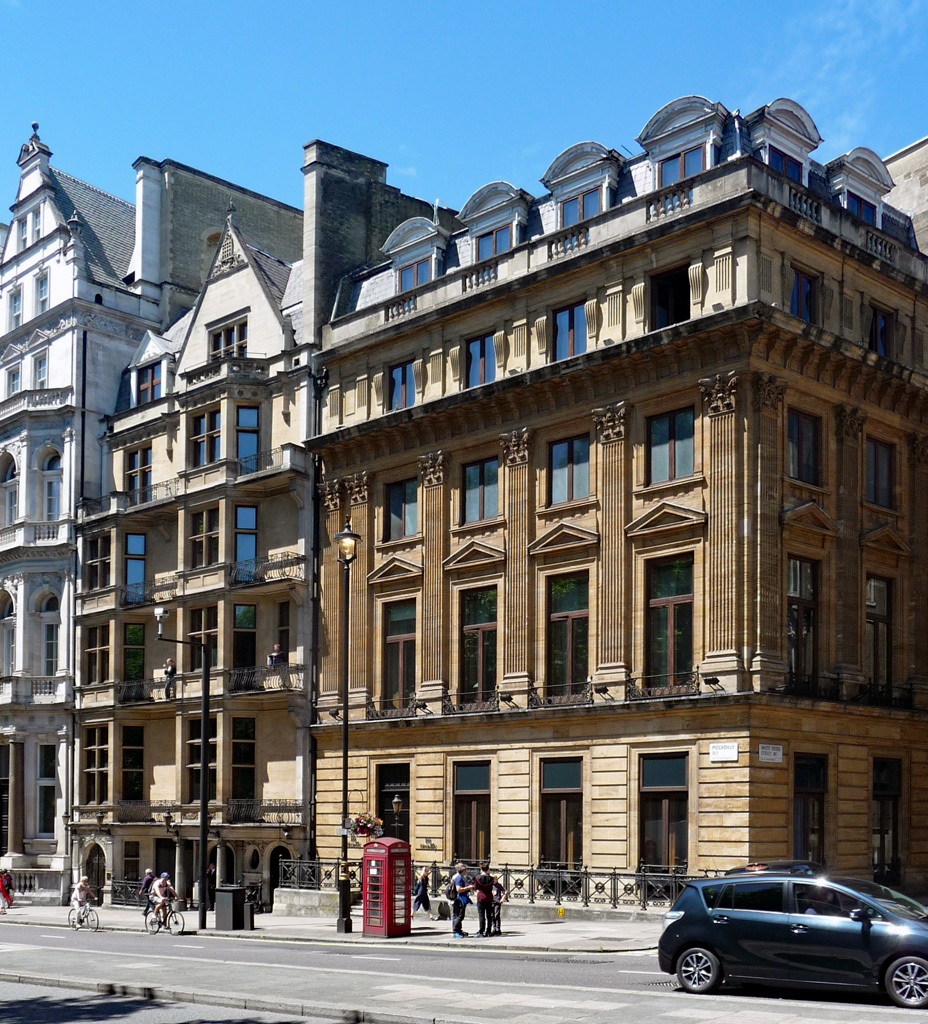
The Public Schools Club

Since then, the club has amalgamated with the Sports Club (1938), the Public Schools Club (1972), and the Devonshire (1976), all of which were short of both members and funds, but it continues to be referred to as the East India Club. The majority of the Club's contemporary membership comes from public schools of the Headmasters' and Headmistresses' Conference: proof of a candidate's matriculation at such a school is all that is needed for membership of the Club.

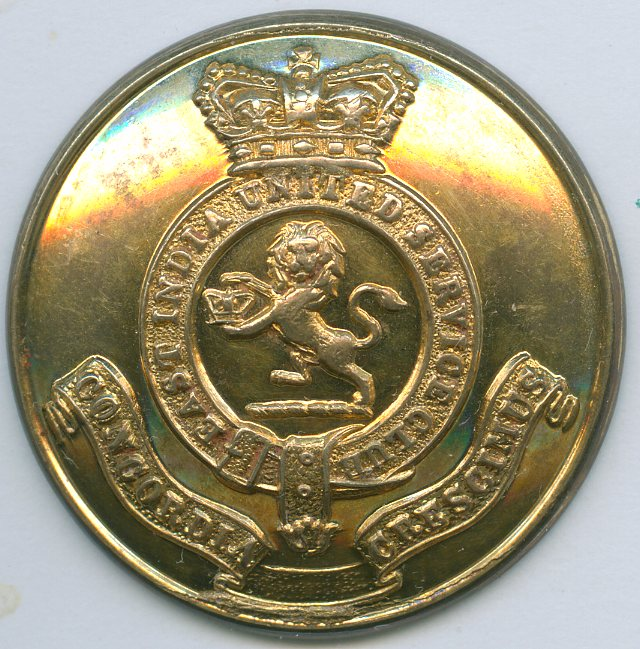
East India Service Club servant's uniform button, c. 1850

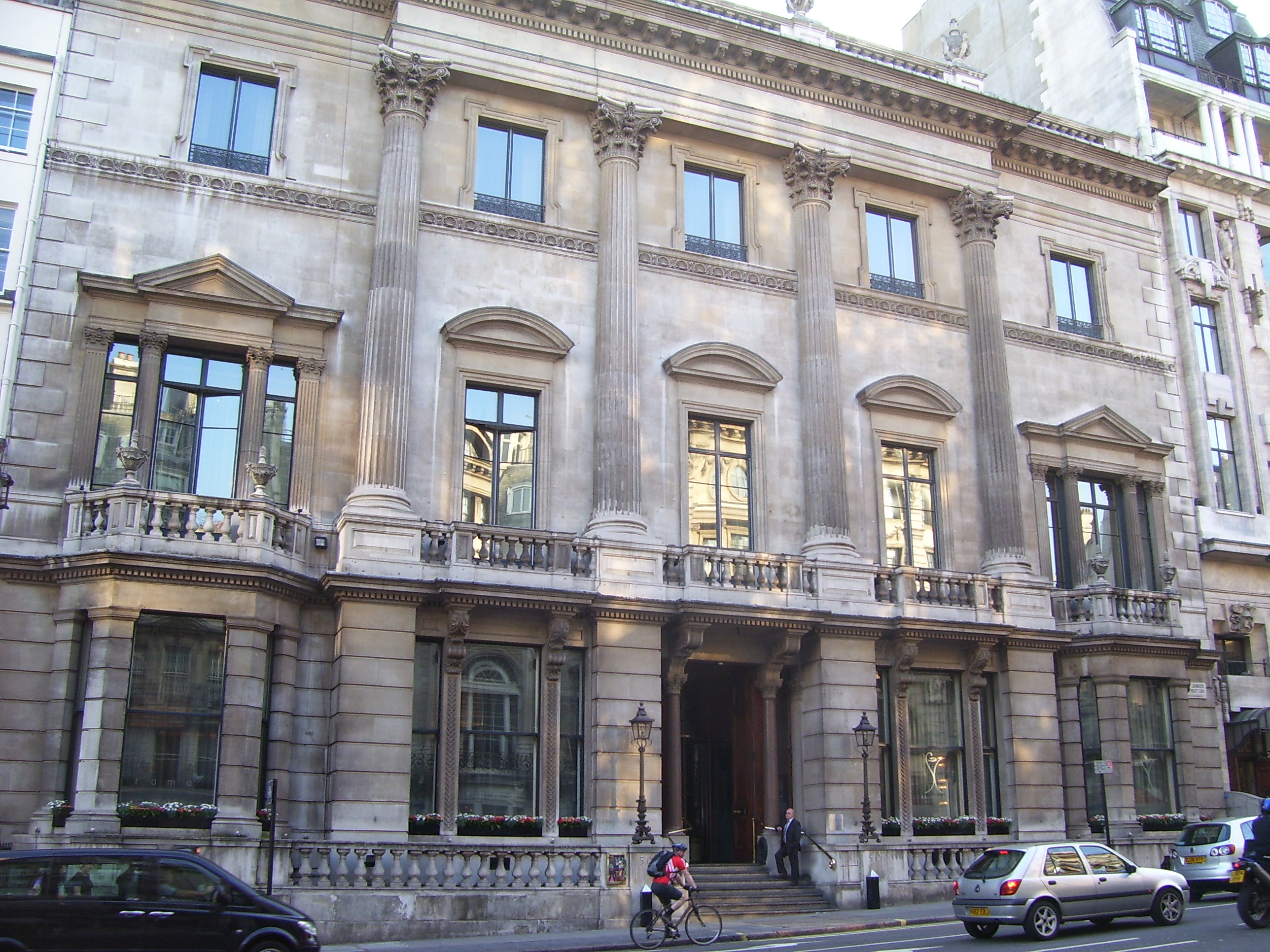
The building of the former Devonshire Club

The club's facilities include a dining room and a luncheon room in addition to the American Bar (named in gratitude to the American officers who stayed at the club during the Second World War and provided funds to refurbish the bar after the war), the Canadian Room (named in gratitude to the Canadian officers who stayed at the club during the Second World War and afterwards provided the timber for the room when it was still in short supply), the Drawing Room, the Smoking Room (in which smoking is not permitted), a cigar lounge (in which it is, providing the cigars smoked are purchased in the Club), the library (which includes antiquarian and contemporary books), the Clive Room (named in honour of famed East India Company General Robert Clive), the Card Room, the Rugby Room (where the International Rugby Board met until its move to Dublin) which is now fitted for study or work, and a gymnasium and sauna, a billiard room and 67 bedrooms (including the St James's Suite). The East India Club is a popular venue for private events hosted by members.

The club has reciprocal arrangements with more than 100 clubs throughout the world. Members can use the facilities of overseas reciprocal clubs with a card or letter of introduction issued by the East India Club.

In 2014, the club made headlines after one of its staff stole over £500,000 over a five-year period before the loss was noticed. The culprit, who spent the money on gambling, then pleaded guilty to the fraud. The Club later threatened to sue its own bank for not adequately warning them of the fraud that took place over five years.

In 2017, Conservative MP Anne Marie Morris (not a member of the Club) had the whip suspended after being recorded speaking to a meeting of Tory MPs at the East India Club using the idiom "nigger in the woodpile", without any response from the other MPs present.

Despite the number of members involved in politics, the club holds no political affiliations.

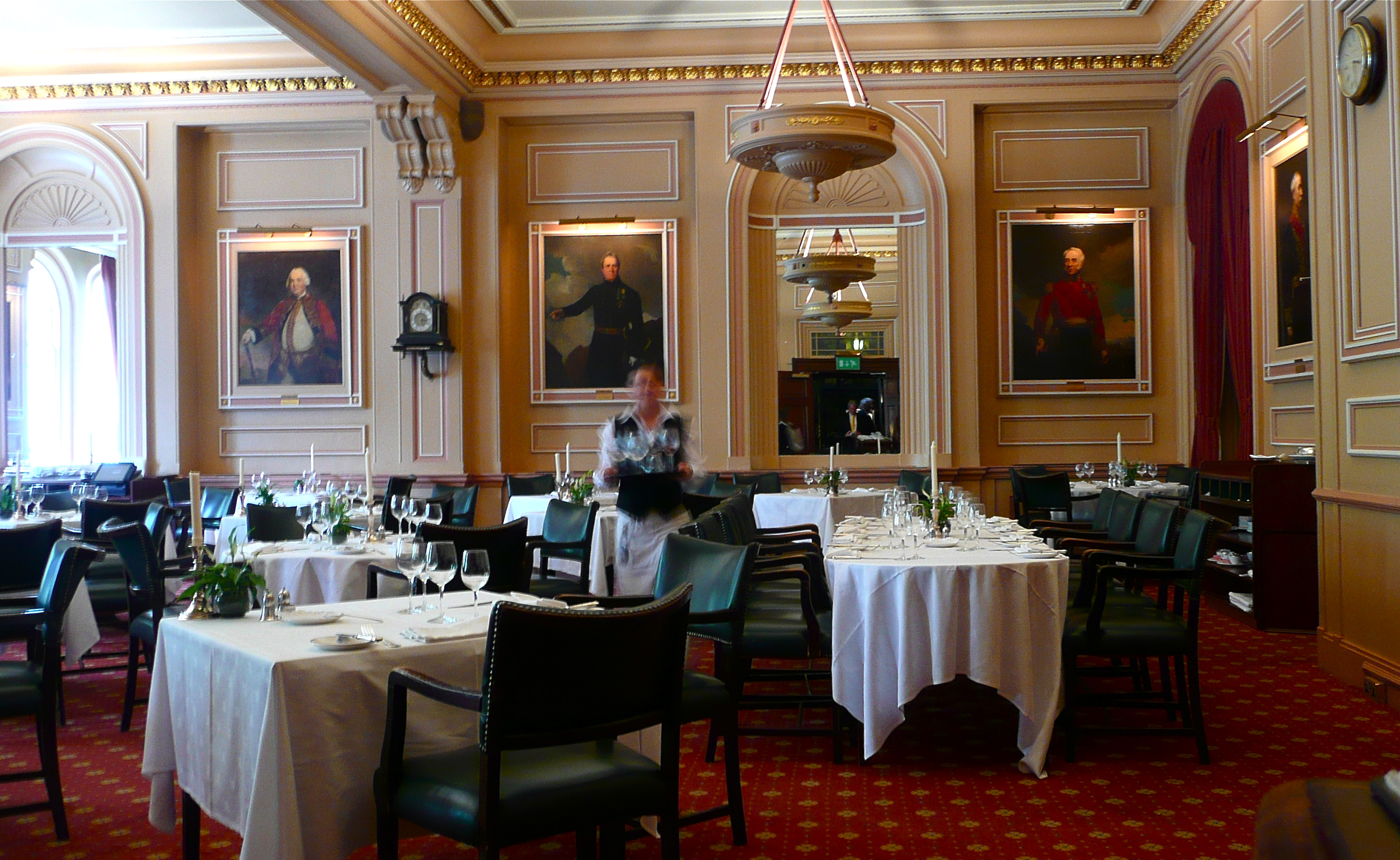
The main dining room

== Club house ==
The club premises are situated at 16 St James's Square, London SW1, on the west side of the square.

The first occupant of the original house to stand on the site was Thomas Jermyn, 2nd Baron Jermyn (?1670–1676). He passed the house on to Robert Villiers, 3rd Viscount Purbeck, who occupied the house for two years (1676–78). After Viscount Purbeck, a Swedish Ambassador occupied the house, followed by two successive Earls of Suffolk and the Earl of Romney. The house was then taken over by Sir John Germain, 1st Baronet, the lover and, later, husband of Mary Howard, Duchess of Norfolk. When Sir John died in 1719, he left the house to his second wife, Lady Elizabeth Berkeley, second daughter of the 2nd Earl of Berkeley. She was to occupy the house for 50 years. When Lady Elizabeth died, the house went to George Germain, 1st Viscount Sackville. It then became the home of Admiral Vere Beauclerk, 1st Baron Vere and then of his son, Aubrey Beauclerk, 5th Duke of St Albans.

In 1785, George Anson bought No. 16. When he died in 1789, the house was passed on to his son, Thomas Anson, 1st Viscount Anson. In 1804, Viscount Anson sold the house to Edmund Boehm, a successful merchant. Mr and Mrs Boehm were very active socially and hosted many dinner parties.

On 21 June 1815, the Prince Regent (later George IV) was the principal guest at a dinner party held at 16 St James's Square. When he heard the news of the victory at Waterloo, Major Henry Percy, aide-de-camp to the Duke of Wellington, presented the Prince Regent with four captured French eagles and Wellington's victory dispatch.

When Edmund Boehm was declared bankrupt, Robert Vyner became the owner of No. 16. In 1825, Vyner sold the house to the Marquess of Clanricarde. During Lord Clanricarde's tenancy, he let the house for a time to the Marquess Wellesley. In 1849, the East India Club Committee signed a lease with Lord Clanricarde. The club bought the house from Lord Clanricarde in 1863.

In 1866, the club demolished the old building, to build the present clubhouse on the same site.

== Sports sections ==
In addition to the facilities at the St James's Square clubhouse, the club has several sports sections. There are active Chess, Cricket, Rowing, Rugby, Billiards, Shooting and Polo teams. The club also has a sports blazer, which may be worn by club members.

=== Cricket ===
There is a mix of Sunday friendly cricket and T20 evening matches, and they end the season with a tour in another country.

=== Polo ===
The Polo Section is a community within the club, with a calendar of events, particularly during the British grass season (April to September). In addition to their active playing schedule, they organise spectating trips both within the UK and abroad, as well as a variety of social events.

=== Rowing ===
The Rowing Section boats out of Quintin Boat Club in Chiswick and competes at events throughout the year. It has twice competed in the Ladies' Challenge Plate as a composite crew and once qualified for the Thames Challenge Cup at Henley Royal Regatta. In 2022, the Section won the Small Club Pennant at the Head of the River Race. The Rowing Section has a different blazer from the main club for those who have competed at senior events or have been awarded a blazer for services to club rowing.

=== Rugby ===
As well as playing annual fixtures against old boys’ associations and representative sides, a range of the club’s social activities also revolve around the sport, for example the screening of major international fixtures.

Notably a series of Rugby Lunches are hosted for members and their guests at the club, typically the day prior to an England fixture.

Through its membership, the club has strong and long-standing links to global rugby administration; this is reflected in various memorabilia and photography around the clubhouse.

=== Shooting ===
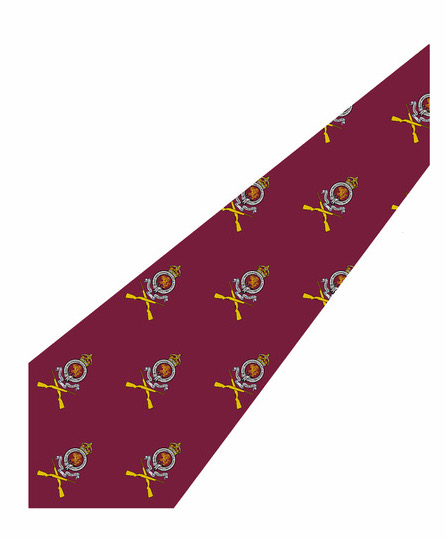
East India Club Shooting Section tie

The Shooting Section exists to provide all members, regardless of experience, the opportunity to shoot with other club members. With more than 300 members, it is currently the largest section of the club.

=== Yachting ===
The club's yacht squadron takes part in a variety of sailing events and has also initiated an inter-club regatta in honour of Colonel Newman VC – a day of sailing races from Seaview, Isle of Wight, in mermaid class boats.

== Patrons of the Club ==
- Prince Albert, Chief Patron, consort of Queen Victoria
- James Broun-Ramsay, 1st Marquess of Dalhousie, Patron
- Edward Law, 1st Earl of Ellenborough, Patron
- General Sir Charles Napier, Patron

== Notable members ==
This is an incomplete list of the notable people who have historically been affiliated with the club or its constituent clubs:

- Prince Frederick of Schleswig-Holstein, first honorary member
- William Adam MP (1823–1881)
- Archibald Acheson, 4th Earl of Gosford (1841–1922)
- Prince Arthur, Duke of Connaught and Strathearn (1850–1942)
- Sir John Dugdale Astley, 3rd Baronet (1828–1894)
- Sir Robert Black (1906–1999)
- James Blyth, 1st Baron Blyth (1841–1925)
- Frederick ("Freddie") Richard Brown MBE (1910–1991)
- Richard Boyle, 9th Earl of Cork (1829–1904)
- General Sir Reginald Alexander Dallas Brooks (1896–1966)
- Sir Roden Cutler VC AK KCMG KCVO CBE (1916–2002)
- Lieutenant-Colonel Augustus Charles Newman VC, OBE, TD, DL (1904–1972)
- Godfrey Bloom MEP (born 1949).
- James Butler, 3rd Marquess of Ormonde (1844–1919)
- David Campbell-Bannerman MEP (born 1960).
- Lord Randolph Churchill (1849–1895)
- Spencer Cavendish, 8th Duke of Devonshire (1833–1908)
- Edward Cavendish, 10th Duke of Devonshire KG (1895–1950)
- Joseph Chamberlain MP (1836–1914)
- Sir Austen Chamberlain KG (1863–1937)
- Sebastian Coe, Baron Coe of Ranmore (born 1956)
- Michael Colin Cowdrey, Baron Cowdrey of Tonbridge (1932–2000)
- William Edwardes, 4th Baron Kensington (1835–1896)
- Nigel Farage, Leader of Reform UK and former Leader of UKIP (born 1964)
- Sir Henry Bartle Frere, 1st Baronet (1815–1884)
- Prince George, Duke of Cambridge (1819–1904)
- Douglas Graham, 5th Duke of Montrose KT (1852–1925)
- Lieutenant General James August Grant CB CSI FRS FRGS (1827-1892)
- George Guise (1943–2020), adviser to Margaret Thatcher
- Robert Halfon MP
- Martin Hawke, 7th Baron Hawke (1860–1938)
- Bret Harte (1836–1902)
- George Holding (born 1968)
- Oliver Wendell Holmes Jr. (1841–1935)
- Sir Leonard Hutton (1916–1990)
- Henry James, 1st Baron James of Hereford (1828–1911)
- Sir Jamsetjee Jejeebhoy, 2nd Baronet (1811–1877)
- Anthony Little (born 1954)
- Hugh Lowther, 5th Earl of Lonsdale KG (1857–1944)
- Peter May CBE (1929–1994)
- Admiral of the Fleet Louis Mountbatten, 1st Earl Mountbatten of Burma (1900–1979)
- Field Marshal Robert Napier, 1st Baron Napier of Magdala (1810–1890)
- Sir Tasker Watkins VC GBE QC (1918–2007)
- Whitelaw Reid (1837–1912)
- Field Marshal Frederick Roberts, 1st Earl Roberts VC (1832–1914)
- Oliver Russell, 2nd Baron Ampthill (1869–1935)
- Maharaja Sir Duleep Singh GCSI (1838–1893)
- Henry Somerset, 10th Duke of Beaufort (1900–1984)
- John Hanning Speke (1827-1862)
- Frederick Temple Hamilton-Temple-Blackwood, 1st Marquess of Dufferin and Ava (1826–1902)
- Sir Denis Thatcher, 1st Baronet MBE, TD (1915–2003)
- Andrew Vicari (1938–2016)
- Tony Lewis CBE (born 1938)
- Michael "Micky" Steele-Bodger CBE (1925–2019)
- John Stevens, Baron Stevens of Kirkwhelpington KStJ QPM DL FRSA (born 1942)
- Geoffrey Dear, Baron Dear, QPM, DL (born 1937)
- Sir Peter Yarranton (1924–2003)
- Sir Pelham Francis Warner (1873–1963)

=== In fiction ===
J. K. Stanford, creator of George Hysteron-Proteron, wrote in 1964 that "George ... owed his origin to a face in the East India Club ... On one occasion at breakfast he sent for the waiter and said, in my hearing, 'Didn't I order mutton cutlets with blood? There's no blood in these! Take them away!' "

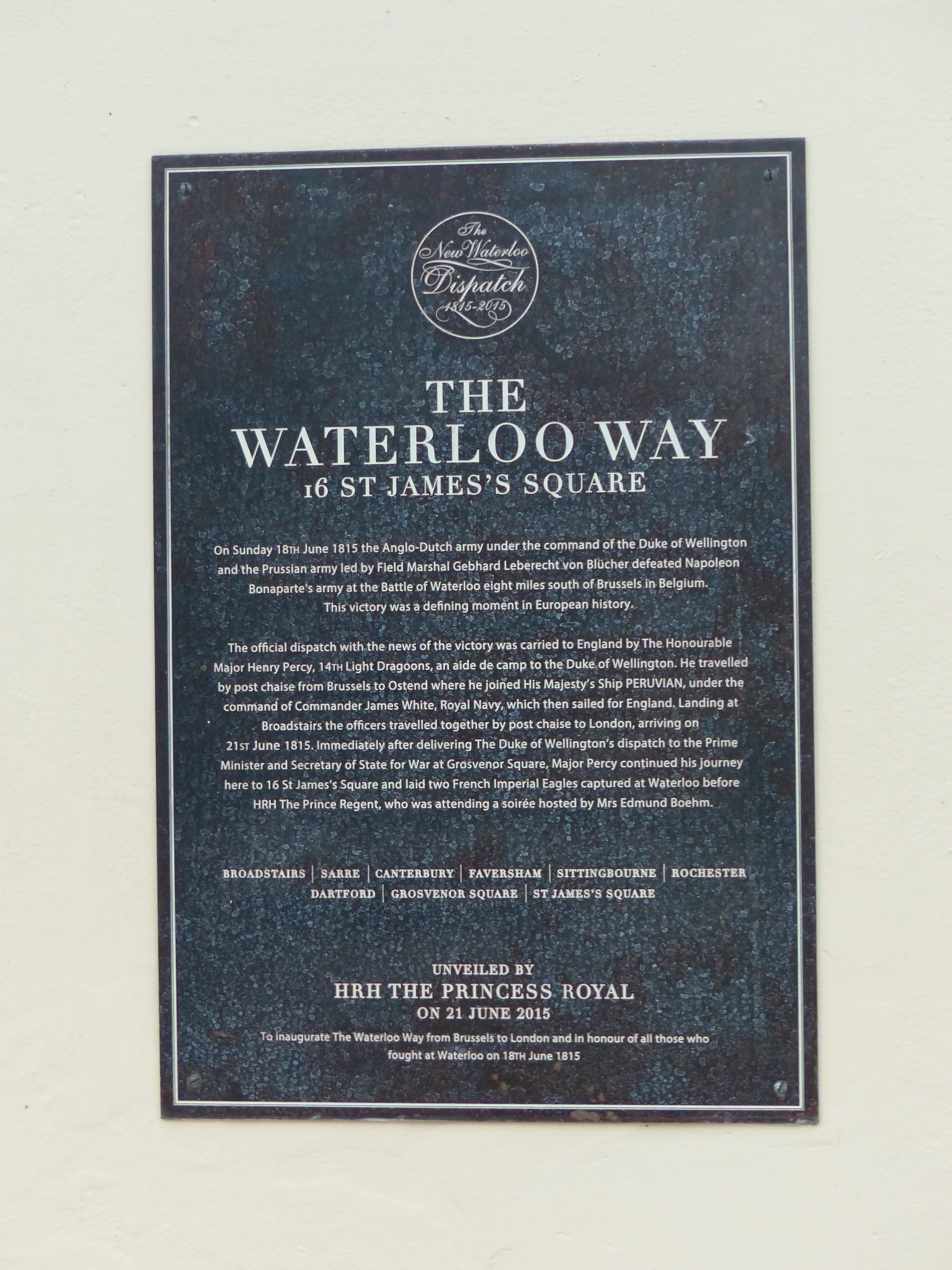
The Battle of Waterloo victory dispatch plaque outside the club, unveiled by Princess Anne

== See also ==
- List of London's gentlemen's clubs
