= Devonshire Club =

London gentlemen's club

Coordinates: 51.507387°N 0.140579°W

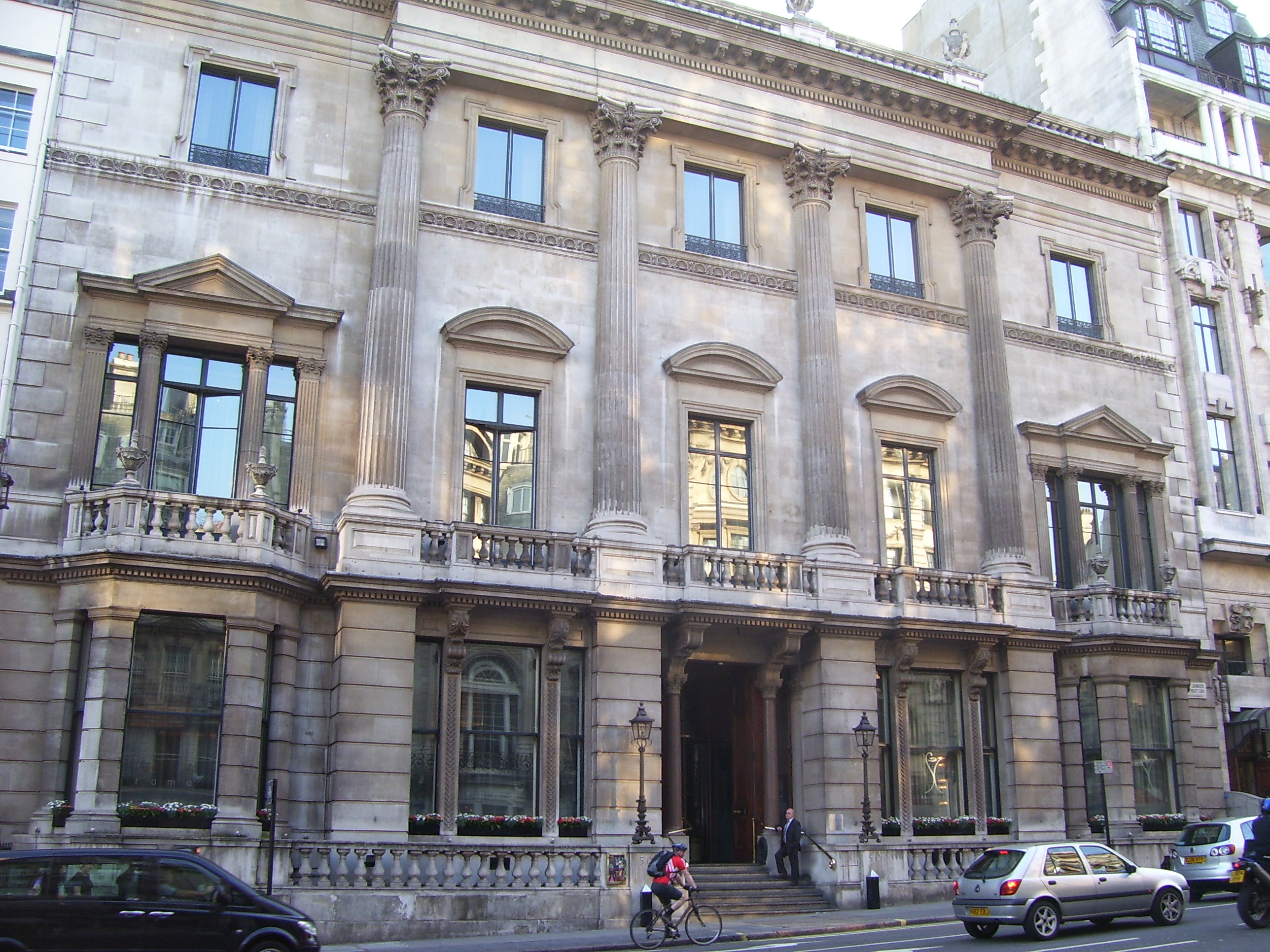
The building of the former Devonshire Club

The Devonshire Club was a London gentlemen's club which was established in 1874 and was disbanded in 1976. Throughout its existence it was based at 50 St James's Street. The major Liberal club of the day was the Reform Club, but in the wake of the Reform Act 1867's extension of the franchise, the waiting list for membership from the larger electorate grew to such an extent that a new club was formed to accommodate these new Liberal voters. The clubhouse was on the western side of St James's Street. The original intention was to call it the 'Junior Reform Club', along the model of the Junior Carlton Club formed in 1866, but complaints from the Reform Club's members led it to being named the Devonshire, in honour of its first chairman, the Duke of Devonshire, an aristocrat from a long line of Liberals.

The club was fortunate in obtaining the St James's Street premises of Crockford's Club, a renowned eighteenth century club which had closed down in 1845. The Devonshire did well in its first decade, but found itself in an awkward position from the 1880s upon the establishment of the National Liberal Club. With a further extension of the franchise in 1885, the much larger National Liberal was aimed at these new electors, and the Devonshire came to possess neither the prestige of Brooks's or the Reform, nor the broader appeal of the National Liberal. The Devonshire soon lost its political flavour.

In the 1960s the Golfers Club shared the premises using a club room at the back of the building and there was also a Masonic temple on site, catering for those lodges without premises.

After a great deal of financial trouble in the 1970s (mirrored in many other clubs of the time, including the Reform, the Carlton, the St James's, the United University, the Junior Carlton, the Army and Navy, and the United Service Club), it finally closed in 1976, with its membership being absorbed by the East India Club.

== See also ==
- List of gentlemen's clubs in London
