= Hanover Lodge =

Mansion in London, England

Coordinates: 51.529586°N 0.165481°W

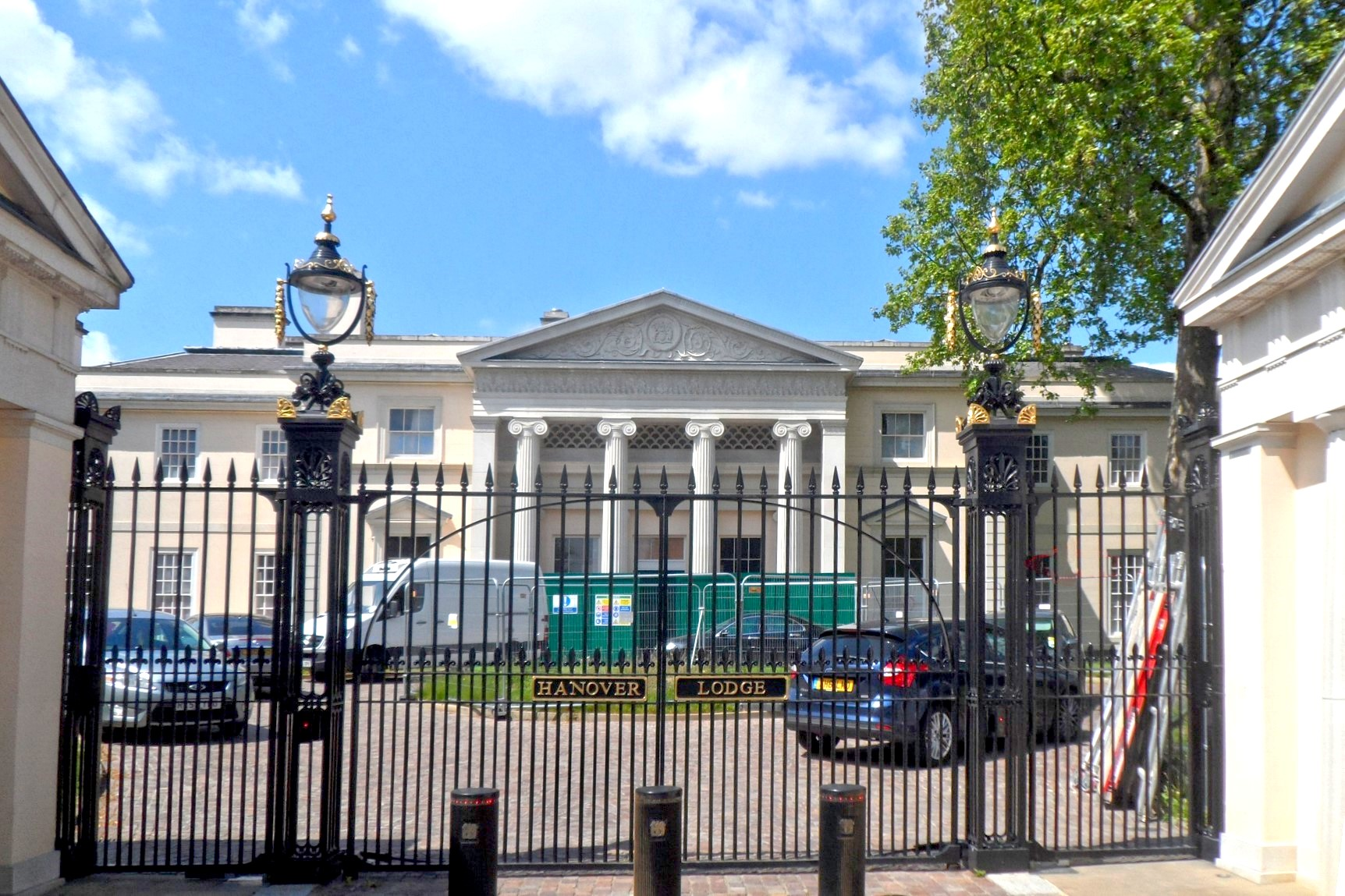
Hanover Lodge, Regent's Park, London

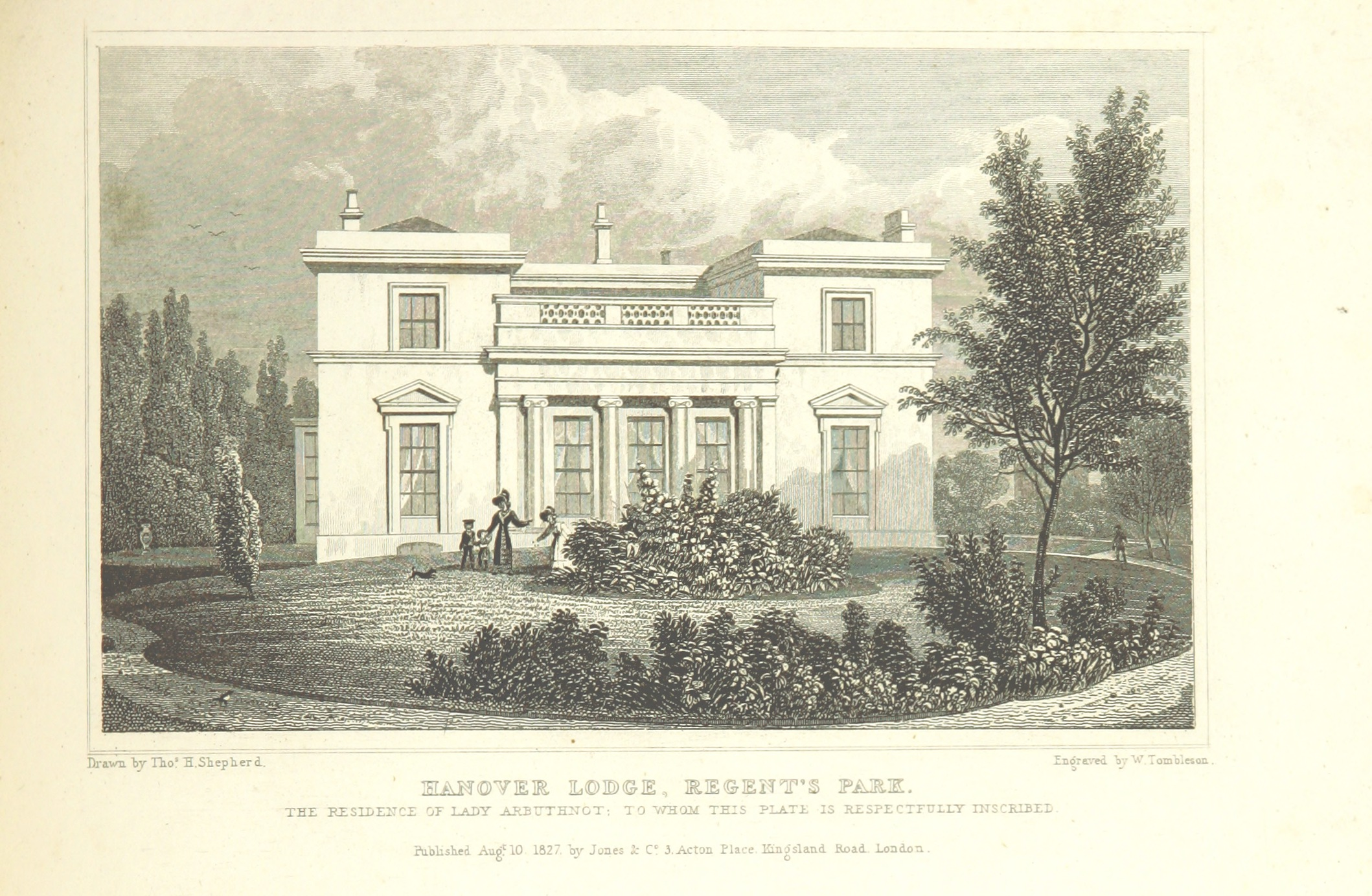
Hanover Lodge in 1828

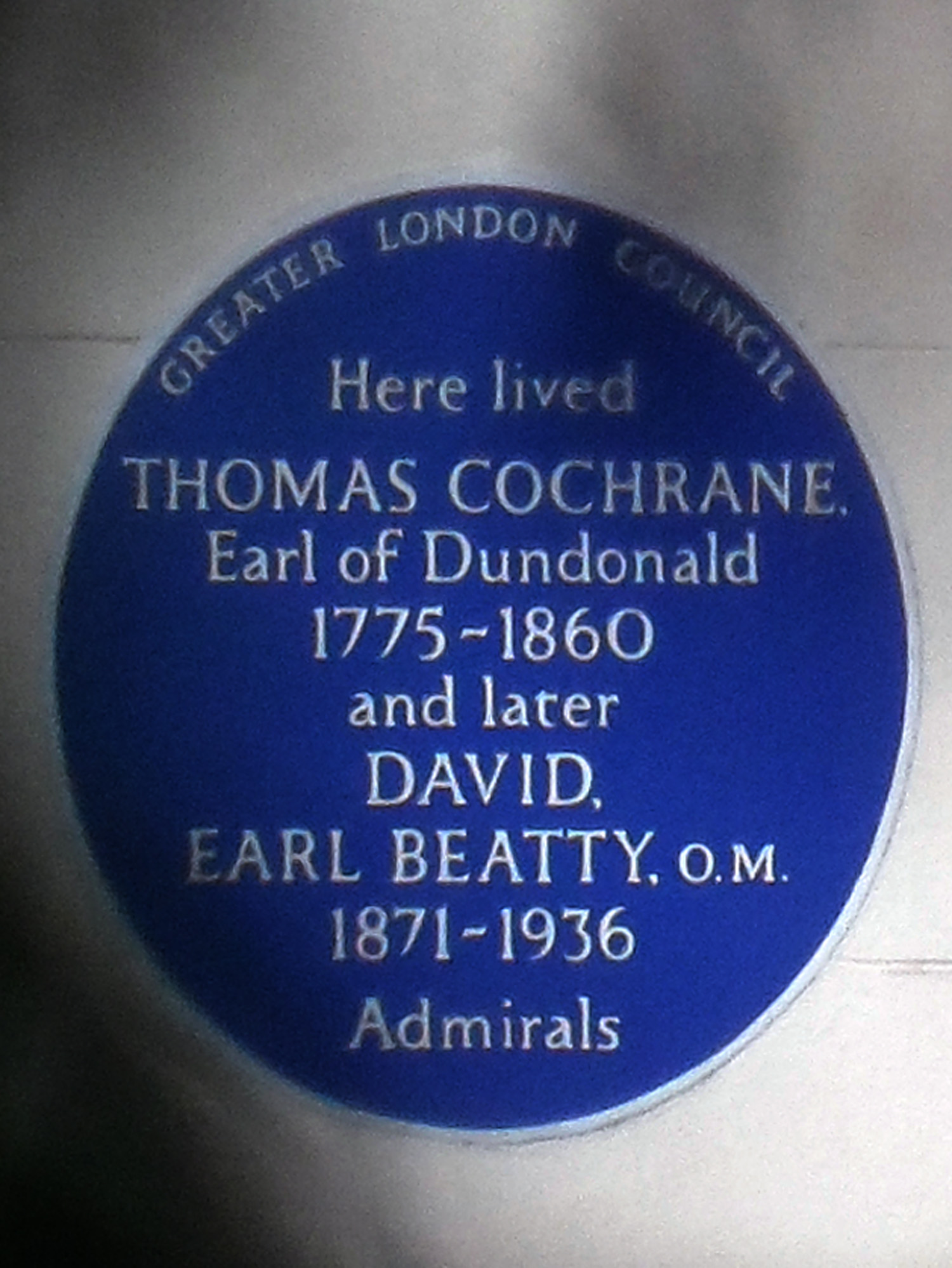
Blue plaque

Hanover Lodge is a Grade II* listed house at 150 Park Road, London NW1, overlooking Regent's Park. It was designed by the architect John Nash, and built for General Sir Robert Arbuthnot. Since then, it has been home to several notable people, was part of Bedford College, and the residence of the French ambassador, before the businessman and Conservative peer Lord Bagri purchased a 150-year lease from the Crown Estate in 1994. The Russian billionaire Andrey Goncharenko purchased the outstanding lease from Lord Bagri in 2012 for £120 million. In July 2023, Indian billionaire Ravi Ruia paid £113 million for the mansion.

== History ==
Hanover Lodge was built in about 1827, and designed by the architect John Nash, "the only villa in the Park personally designed by Nash", for Robert Arbuthnot.

From 1832 to 1845, it was the home of Thomas Cochrane, 10th Earl of Dundonald, and the exterior bears a blue plaque in his honour. From 1848 to 1897, it was the property of the banker Matthew Uzielli (1806–1860) and his descendants.

The upper storey was totally rebuilt in about 1909, and the house extended, by the architect Edwin Lutyens. From 1911 to 1925, it was the home of David Beatty, 1st Earl Beatty, and the exterior bears a blue plaque in his honour. From 1926, it was the home of the American heiress and socialite Mrs von Hofmannsthal (née Astor), daughter-in-law of the poet and librettist Hugo von Hofmannsthal. From 1948, it was part of Bedford College, but in the 1990s it was rented by the French government to house their ambassador.

In 1994, the businessman and Conservative peer Lord Bagri purchased a 150-year lease on Hanover Lodge from the Crown Estate for £5.9 million and over the next 12 years spent millions of pounds renovating it, hiring the architect Quinlan Terry to supervise, including an underground swimming pool that can be converted into a ballroom. Renovations were finally completed in 2009, "after 10 years and 100 applications for planning and listed building consents" costing an estimated £25 million.

In 2012, Andrey Goncharenko, a Russian billionaire, bought Hanover Lodge for £120 million from Lord Bagri. In 2014, the Evening Standard called it "the most expensive townhouse ever sold in Britain". By way of comparison, Park Place, a country house with 200 acres of grounds in Remenham, near Henley-on-Thames was sold for £140 million; and an apartment at One Hyde Park, in Knightsbridge, went for £136 million, both in 2011.

Goncharenko has made a series of planning applications to "further enlarge the basement and to remodel the interior" of the 26,000 sq ft house. The basement already has a swimming pool that converts into a ballroom, but it has been deemed to be "too small". The extension would include a new larger pool, sauna and steam room, gym, beauty salon, yoga studio, two massage rooms, a cinema, wine cellar and games room. Above ground, "much of the work appears to involve ripping out large swathes of expensive décor only recently installed by Lord Bagri, including intricate cornicing, decorative wall-frieze paintings and timber and marble floors".

On 22 July 2023, it became known that the mansion was purchased by Indian billionaire Ravi Ruia, who paid £113 million for it. The purchase has become one of the largest transactions in the London property market in recent years.
