= George Guise =

British businessman and political adviser

George Robert John Guise (17 June 1943 – 19 April 2020) was a British business executive and political adviser to Margaret Thatcher.

== Early life and education ==
Guise was born in Cardiff on 17 June 1943. He attended Ratcliffe College from 1954 to 1961 and graduated from Christ Church, Oxford with a degree in physics in 1964. After a year at Durham University, where he completed the advanced course in geophysics, he pursued doctoral research at the University of Witwatersrand in Johannesburg, South Africa.

== Career ==
=== Early career ===
In 1968, Guise joined Consolidated Gold Fields Group following university. His early roles included programming one of the first computers in South Africa. He returned to Britain in 1973 and became the youngest executive director of the company in 1981.

=== Number 10 Policy Unit ===
Brian Griffiths recruited Guise to the Number 10 Policy Unit in September 1986 to provide guidance on industrial policy and research and development. His role soon expanded to advising on science policy after Prime Minister Margaret Thatcher learned about his background in physics and asked him to review all the science material sent to her.

He opposed government funding of near-market research and believed this was best left to and paid for by private industry, and advocated for the prioritisation of funds for "curiosity-driven research" as a better alternative. His views put him in conflict with the Advisory Council on Science and Technology (ACOST), which continued to back government funding for advanced manufacturing research into the final year of the Third Thatcher ministry, as well as certain officials in the Department of Trade and Industry.

In November 1989 Guise supported a proposal to require British Coal to restore "defunct pithead areas and tips" — negatively comparing the "present practice of allowing British Coal to leave an environmental mess behind" to the standards of East European socialist states. The following March, having taken advice from British Coal, he authored a confidential memo which advocated the closure of eight collieries in the event of another miners' strike.

Due to his experience working in the country, Guise was also a direct source of advice on British policy towards apartheid South Africa and made annual visits on which he reported to the prime minister. He was against the imposition of trade sanctions, which he believed risked fuelling civil war. He left the policy unit in November 1990 in the aftermath of Thatcher's resignation.

=== Later career ===
Guise held non-executive positions at Deloitte and Touche and National Grid. He was also active as an adviser on privatisation to the governments of Hungary, Poland, Czech Republic, Turkey, Venezuela and Post-apartheid South Africa. He retired in 2003.

== Personal life ==
Guise married Hilary Beck in South Africa in 1972. They had three sons. He was a member of the East India Club.

== Selected publications ==
- Guise, George (2014). "Margaret Thatcher's influence on British science". Notes and Records: The Royal Society Journal of the History of Science. 68 (3): 301–309. doi:10.1098/rsnr.2013.0067. PMC 4123659.
- ——— (2015). Inside the Tank. London: Bretwalda Books. ISBN 9781910440087.
