= Shashi and Ravi Ruia =

Indian businessmen

Shashi Ruia Ravi Ruia
- Occupation: Businessmen
- Organization: Essar Group

Shashi Ruia (23 December 1943 – 25 November 2024) and his younger brother Ravi Ruia (born 22 April 1949), known together as the Ruia brothers, are Indian billionaires, and were the owners of Essar Group, founded in 1969.

In 2012, Forbes named the Ruia brothers as the world's richest Indians with a net worth of US$7 billion.

Shashi Ruia died on 25 November 2024 at the age of 80.

== Ravi Ruia ==
Ravi Ruia was born in 22 April 1949. He is a mechanical engineer by profession, with a degree from the College of Engineering, Guindy, Chennai.

He is married to Madhu, they have two children, and live in Mumbai, India.

=== Career ===
Ruia started his career at his family business and worked with Shashi Ruia, his elder brother. Essar Group is a multinational conglomerate and is active in the steel, oil and gas, power, communications, shipping, ports and logistics, projects and minerals industries. With operations in more than 20 countries across five continents, the group employs 75,000 people, with revenues of US$17 billion.

Having acquired the Stanlow refinery from Shell in 2011, the Essar Group continued a strategy of international diversification. In April 2013 Ravi Ruia was awarded the Outstanding Contribution to Sustainability award at The Asian Awards in London.

Essar Energy completed the transaction for the sale of Essar Oil to Rosneft and a consortium led by Trafigura & UCP at an enterprise valuation of US$12.9 billion. This transaction represents Russia's largest ever foreign investment, as well as India's largest Foreign Direct Investment. He was the 12th richest person living in the UK, as in the Sunday Times Rich List 2011. Ruia managed Essar's globalization plans, including new ventures in South East Asia, Africa, and the Middle East. He has received Business India Businessman of the Year Award 2010.

In December 2011, India's Central Bureau of Investigation commenced an investigation concerning Ruia for the sale of India's 2G spectrum, which was denied by the Essar Group. After a lengthy legal process, in December 2017, the Indian Courts acquitted Ruia of any impropriety in the case, holding that the prosecution had "miserably failed to prove any charge against any of the accused".

In the summer of 2023, Ravi Ruia purchased the London mansion Hanover Lodge from Russian businessman Andrey Goncharenko for £113 million.

== See also ==
- David and Frederick Barclay
