= Crockford's (club) =

London gentlemen's club

Coordinates: 51.507387°N 0.140579°W

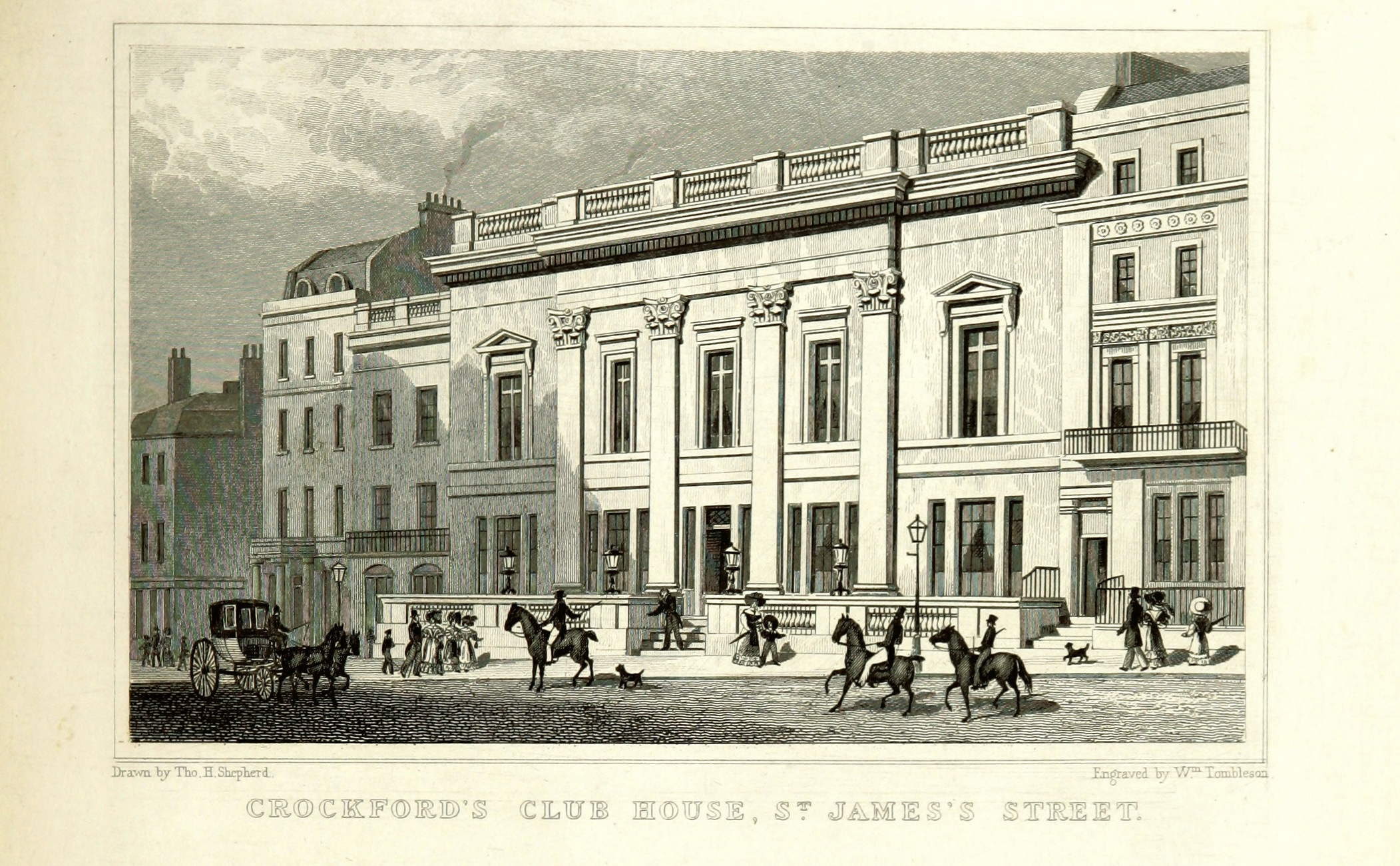
An 1828 illustration of Crockford's

St James's Club, popularly known as Crockford's, was a gentlemen's club in London established in 1823 by William Crockford. It closed in 1845, re-founded in 1928 and closed in 1970. One of London's older clubs, it was centred on gambling and maintained a somewhat raffish and raucous reputation. Crockford employed Benjamin Wyatt and Philip Wyatt to construct the city's most opulent palace of gentlemanly pleasure, which opened in November 1827. and he employed two of London's finest chefs of the time, Louis Eustache Ude and then Charles Elmé Francatelli to feed its members, food and drink being supplied free after midnight.

From 1823, the club leased 50 St. James's Street, and then nos. 51–53, which enabled Crockford to pull down all four houses and build his palatial club on the site. After the club's closure, this continued to be used as a clubhouse, at first briefly by the short-lived Military, Naval and County Service Club, and then between 1874 and 1976 it was home to the Devonshire Club.

The latter Crockfords, though using much of the "Crocky" imagery and high-end reputation, had no connection with the original club and operated from an entirely different building at nearby 30 Curzon Street.

== Founder ==
William Crockford was born on 13 January 1776, the son of William and Mary Ann Crockford, and was baptised at St Clement Danes in London on 12 February 1776. He began life working in his father's fish shop adjoining Temple Bar (at the original site of that landmark gate – now to be found aside St Paul's Cathedral). His ability at calculation was to stand him in good stead: he quickly took to gambling, and after a number of long sessions amassed a tidy sum – enough to launch himself into Regency clubland. He acquired a site in St James's Street and opened a building that was to become the most famous gaming house in Europe: "Crockford's". He catered to the aristocracy, took a charge on every bet laid, and in the process amassed a fortune estimated at the time of his 'retirement' in 1840 to have been £1,200,000 in the currency of the time, certainly enough to establish homes at 11 Carlton House Terrace at which he died (later to become Prime Minister William Gladstone's home) and at Panton House, Newmarket. Although he had technically retired in 1840, leaving the running of the club to a management committee, he still owned the lease, which was sold after his death for £2,900, with twenty-two years still to run at a yearly rent of £1,400.

He married first Mary Lockwood in 1801 and then Sarah Frances Douglas on 20 May 1812 in St George's, Hanover Square; he fathered 14 children and died on 24 May 1844. He lies buried in a family vault underneath the Chapel of Kensal Green Cemetery, London.

== Refounding ==
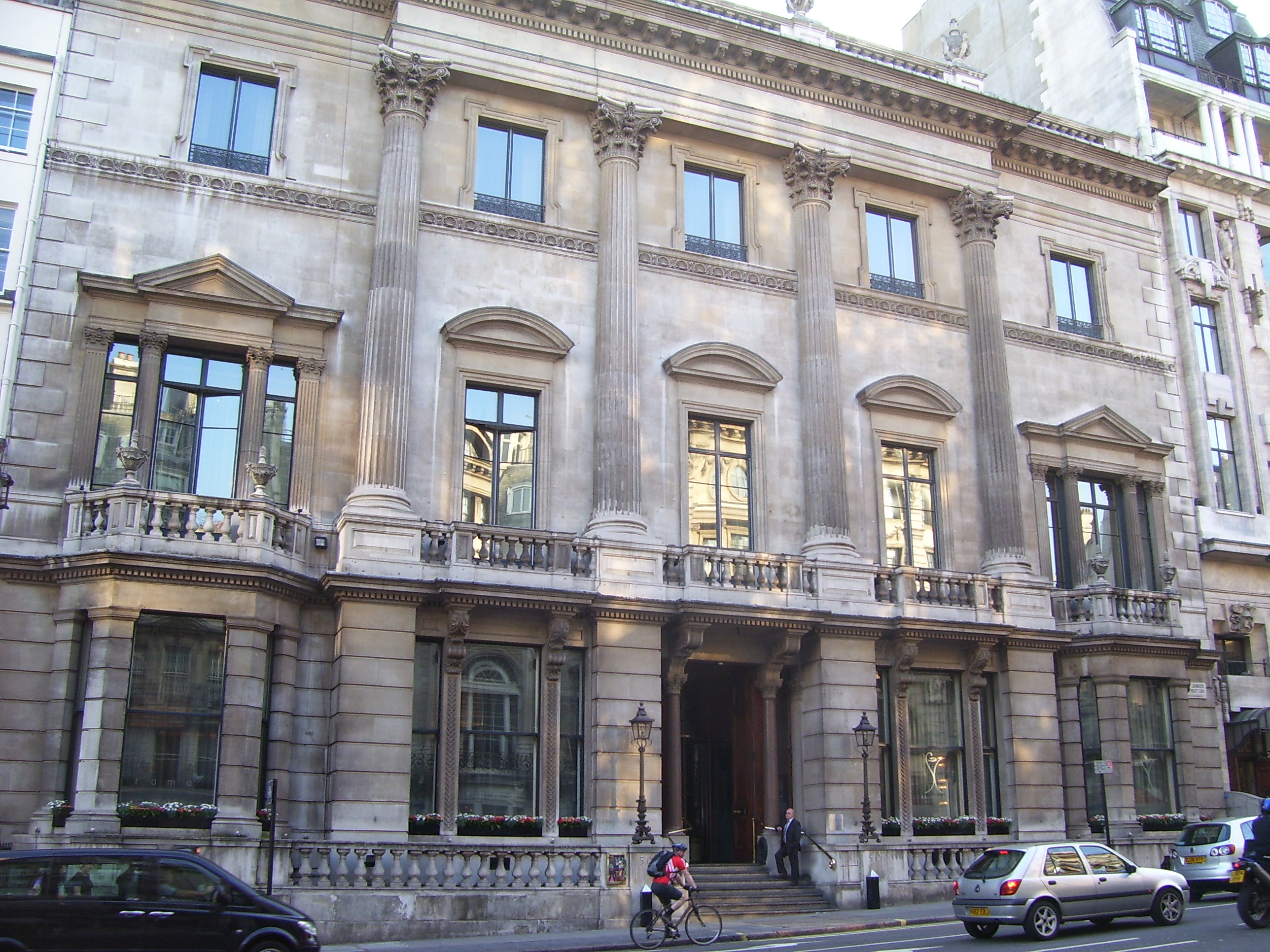
50 St. James's Street today

In 1928, the club was refounded primarily as a bridge club patronised by British players including world champion Terence Reese and Kenneth Konstam. Subsequently, chemin-de-fer, roulette and blackjack were added, reverting the club to its gambling traditions.

== See also ==
- List of gentlemen's clubs in London
- William Crockford
- Colin Smythe, 'Charles Elmé Francatelli, Crockford's and the Royal Connection'. http://colinsmythe.co.uk/charles-elme-francatelli-crockfords-and-the-royal-connection/
