= Binani Industries =

Indian industrial conglomerate

- Company type: Public
- Traded as: BSE: 500059; NSE: BINANIIND
- Industry: Cement, Zinc & glass fiber
- Founded: 1872; 154 years ago
- Headquarters: Mumbai, Maharashtra, India
- Area served: Worldwide
- Key people: Braj Binani (Chairman), Sunil Sethy (MD)
- Number of employees: 1500
- Subsidiaries: Binani Cement Ltd, Binani Zinc Ltd, Goa Glass Fibre Ltd& BT Composites Ltd.
- Website: Official website

Binani Industries Ltd is an Indian business group based in Mumbai. It belongs to the Braj Binani Group. The business portfolio of Binani Industries includes sectors like cement, zinc, glass-fiber, and downstream composite products.

Binani Industries holds the following subsidiaries:

- Binani Cement Ltd - Cement
- Binani Zinc Ltd - Electrolytic Zinc
- Goa Glass Fiber Ltd. - Glass Fiber

Binani Industries owns more than 98% of Binani Cement.

Binani Industries holds operations in sales, manufacturing, and R&D in Asia, Europe, and North America.

== Controversy ==
Calcutta High Court issued an order for the winding up of Binani Industries Ltd, the holding company of Binani Cement Ltd, due to its default on paying Rs5.65 crore to the advertising agency Milestone Brandcom Pvt Ltd.
