= 50 St James's Street =

House in St James's Street, London, England

Coordinates: 51.507387°N 0.140579°W

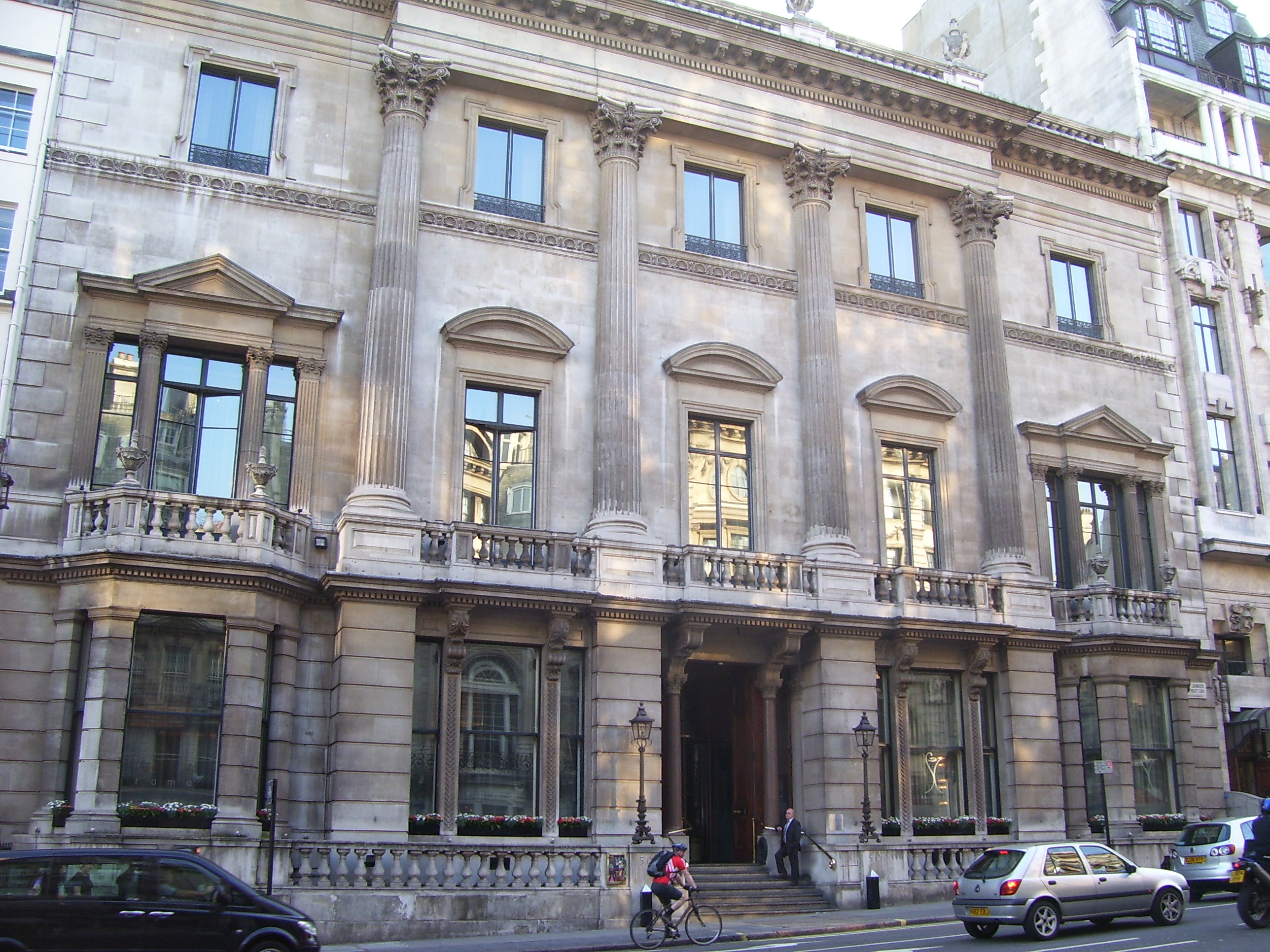
50 St James's Street

50 St James's Street is a Grade II listed house in St James's Street, St James's, London SW1, opposite White's Club.

It was built in 1827, and designed by the architects Benjamin Wyatt and Philip Wyatt, as Crockford's, a gentleman's club. It was altered from 1870–75 by C. J. Phipps.

From 1999 to 2009, a luxury casino named Fifty, owned by Robert Earl, operated on the premises.

Next, the property was secured by Luca Del Bono, an Anglo-Italian property developer. To this end, in 2011, Westminster City Council approved plans to create a members' club, spa, 14-bedroom hotel, and two public restaurants.

In 2014, the property was bought by the Russian billionaire Andrey Goncharenko for £70 million, apparently with the intention of converting it to residential use.
