= Essar Group =

Indian Multinational Conglomerate

- Official logo

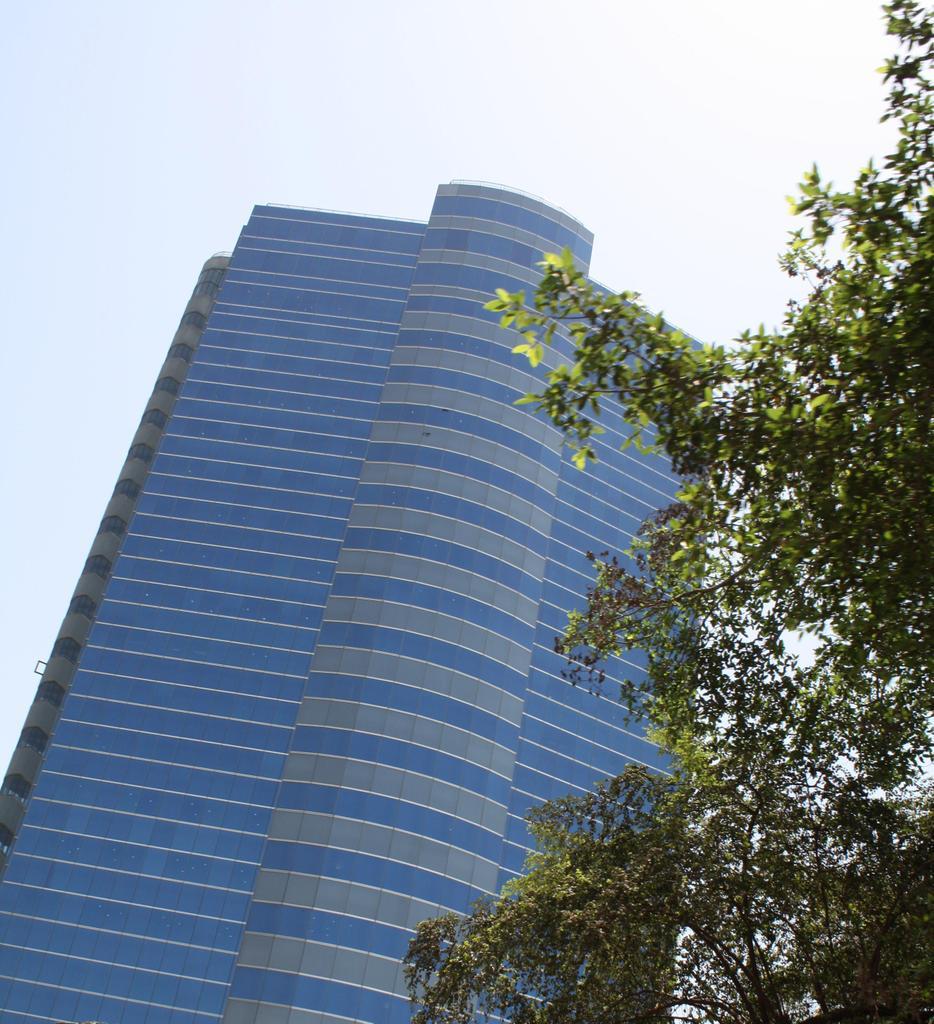
- Essar House (Headquarters), Mumbai, India
- Type: Private
- Industry: Conglomerate
- Founded: 1969; 57 years ago
- Founder: Shashi Ruia; Ravi Ruia
- Headquarters: Mumbai, Maharashtra, India
- Area served: Worldwide
- Key people: Ravi Ruia (Vice-Chairman); Prashant Ruia (Group CEO)
- Products: Fuel; Coalbed methane; Power; Bulk Cargo handling; Coal mining; Shipping; IT Services
- Revenue: ▲₹120,000 crore (US$12 billion) (2022)
- Total assets: ▲₹64,000 crore (US$6.6 billion) (2022)
- Number of employees: 7,000+
- Subsidiaries: Essar Energy; Essar Shipping (est. 1945); Essar Oil UK; Essar Oil & Gas Exploration & Production; Essar Ports; Essar Power; Essar Projects; Black Box Corporation
- Website: www.essar.com

Essar Group is an Indian multinational conglomerate company, founded by Shashi Ruia and Ravi Ruia in 1969. The company, known as Essar Global Fund Limited (EGFL), owns assets in energy (oil refining, oil and gas exploration and production, power), infrastructure & logistics (ports, projects), metals & mining, technology, and retail (oilfield services, information technology, and food retail).

Significant Essar Group companies include Essar Oil UK, Essar Ports, Essar Oil & Gas Exploration & Production, Essar Shipping, Essar Power, and Essar Projects.

== History ==
In 1969, Shashi Ruia won a contract worth Rs. 2.3 crore for the construction of an outer breakwater for Chennai Port, thus laying the foundation of Essar Group.

In 1991, Essar started a 515 MW cycle power plant at Hazira. It later built and operated national power plants in Madhya Pradesh, Gujarat, Odisha, and internationally in Ontario, Canada.

In 1992, Essar acquired the South India Shipping Corporation.

In 1995, Essar Group entered the telecom sector with a Swiss PTT joint venture partnership branded as the Essar Cellphone. In the same year, Essar Group started GSM operations from Delhi. Essar, independently and in partnership with Hutchison (Hutchison Essar), subsequently acquired more telecom circles in India. By 2006, all the circles were under Hutchison Essar Limited. Vodafone bought the Hutchison stake, and Hutchison exited India in 2006. Essar Group continued to have a 33% stake in the Vodafone Essar partnership. In 2011, Essar sold its stake and exited the telecom business.

In 2006, Essar Oil imported its first consignment of 2.2 billion crude oil at Vadinar in Gujarat.

In 2007, Essar owned The MobileStore, an Indian chain of telecom and mobile phone retail stores.

In 2017, Essar Steel India Ltd. (ESIL) was on the defaulter's list disclosed by the Reserve Bank of India. Essar Oil was acquired by a consortium led by Rosneft, Trafigura, and UCP Investment Group for $12.9 billion, and Essar Oil was rebranded as Nayara Energy.

In 2018, Essar signed an offtake agreement with GAIL for Raniganj East CBM block production. Essar Oil & Gas Exploration & Production Ltd. (EOGEPL) owns coal bed methane producing block in Raniganj, West Bengal.

In 2019, EOGEPL received environment clearance for exploring shale gas reserves in Raniganj block, West Bengal.

In November 2019, ArcelorMittal won approval from the Supreme Court to take over Essar Steel and pay the creditors with equal rights. ArcelorMittal’s bid of Rs 42,000 crore was considered over Essar’s bid of Rs 54,000 crore.

In March 2020, Moneycontrol reported that Essar Group had cut down debt by 70% to about ₹12,000 crore. Press research from 2026 showed that in 2020 the Essar Groups debt with the Russian state controlled VTB Bank rose to Euro 2,35 billion.

Essar has established Vertex Hydrogen in the UK.

After the Russian invasion of Ukraine in February 2022 and the following sanctions against representatives the VTB bank, press research indicates that Essar moved it's management for the dept with the Russian bank from Cyprus in the European Union to Mauritius, where the sanctions did not apply.

In September 2022, Essar Oil UK completed an offtake agreement with Vertex Hydrogen to facilitate hydrogen supply of 280 MW to decarbonize its plants.

In November 2022, the Essar Group reportedly became debt-free after clearing $25 billion in liabilities, following the sale of its power plant and captive ports to ArcelorMittal Nippon Steel at a deal value of $2.05 billion.

== Business verticals ==
The Essar Group comprises a range of companies in core economy sectors.

=== Energy ===
- Essar Energy Transition
- Essar Oil UK
- Essar Oil & Gas Exploration & Production Ltd
- Essar Power Ltd
- Essar Future Energy

=== Infrastructure & logistics ===
- Essar Ports
- Stanlow Terminals
- Essar Projects
- Ultra Gas & Energy

=== Metals & mining ===
- Essar Minmet
- Mesabi Metallics
- Manoor Bulatn Lestari
- KSA Saudi

=== Technology & retail ===
- Black Box (Previously known as AGC Networks Ltd)
- Essar Shipping
- Pluckk

== Acquisitions ==
In 2003, Essar Group acquired Aegis Communication and spread across 13 countries. In 2014, Essar did a part sale of Aegis USA Inc. with annual revenues of $400 million to Teleperformance, and in 2017, Essar left the outsourcing business by selling Aegis’ operations to Capital Square Partners (CSP).

Essar Steel acquired HGPL and SCGL from Stemcor in 2005 and became an integrated steel producer.

In 2007, Essar Global acquired a US-based steel company named Minnesota Steel LLC.

In 2010, Essar Global acquired Aries coal mines in Indonesia.

In 2011, Essar Energy purchased Stanlow Refinery in North West England for $1.3 billion. Under Essar's leadership, the first phase of the turnaround of Stanlow refinery has been started during the financial year 2015–16 with $187 million net profit. Essar plans a £250 million expansion of Stanlow refinery, with over 16% production of transport fuels in the UK.

AGC Networks, a wholly owned subsidiary of Essar Group, acquired Black Box Corporation in 2019.

== Initiatives ==
During the COVID-19 pandemic, Essar Foundation opened Covid Care Centre at Devbhumi Dwarka, Gujarat, organized vaccination drives, and provided meals to needy people.

In 1997, the company started Essar Foundation for philanthropic initiatives in the areas of education, health, environment, women's empowerment, infrastructure, livelihoods & entrepreneurship.

== See also ==
- Conglomerate companies of India
- Shipping Corporation of India
- Shashi and Ravi Ruia
