= Freeling =

Freeling may refer to:

- Major-General Sir Arthur Henry Freeling, Surveyor-General of South Australia from 1849 to 1861
  - Freeling, South Australia, a small town, named for Arthur Freeling
- Christian Freeling (1947–2026), Dutch game designer and inventor/author of various chess variants
- Sir Francis Freeling, first baronet (1764–1836), postal administrator and book collector (ODNB)
- Monroe Freeling (born 2004), American football player
- Nicolas Freeling (1927–2003), British crime writer
- Freeling is the surname of the main character Carol Anne and her family in the Poltergeist (film) trilogy as well as in the novelizations based on the films.
