= Belsize Park =

Area in Hampstead, London

Coordinates: 51°32′50″N 0°10′04″W

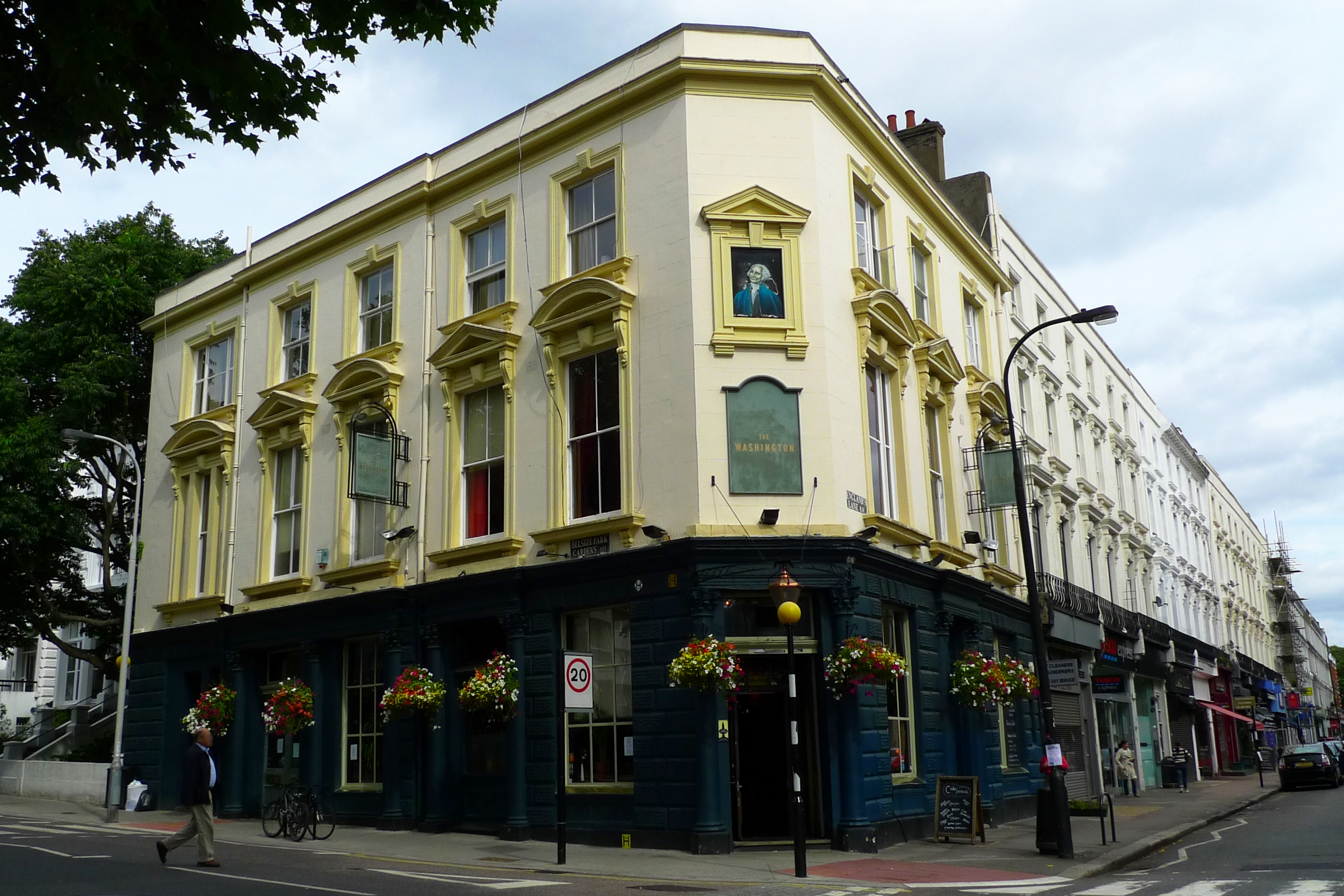
- The Washington public house on England's Lane

- Location within Greater London
- OS grid reference: TQ273845
- London borough: Camden
- Ceremonial county: Greater London
- Region: London
- Country: England
- Sovereign state: United Kingdom
- Post town: LONDON
- Postcode district: NW3
- Dialling code: 020
- Police: Metropolitan
- Fire: London
- Ambulance: London
- UK Parliament: Hampstead and Highgate
- London Assembly: Barnet and Camden

Belsize Park is a residential area of Hampstead in the London Borough of Camden, in the inner north-west of London, England.

The streets are lined with Georgian and Victorian villas and mews houses. Some nearby localities are Hampstead village to the north and west, Camden Town to the south-east and Primrose Hill to the south. There are restaurants, pubs, cafés, and independent boutiques in Belsize Village, and on Haverstock Hill and England's Lane. Hampstead Heath is close by, and Primrose Hill park is a five-minute walk from England's Lane.

Belsize Park is in the Hampstead and Highgate constituency whose present MP is Tulip Siddiq.

== History ==
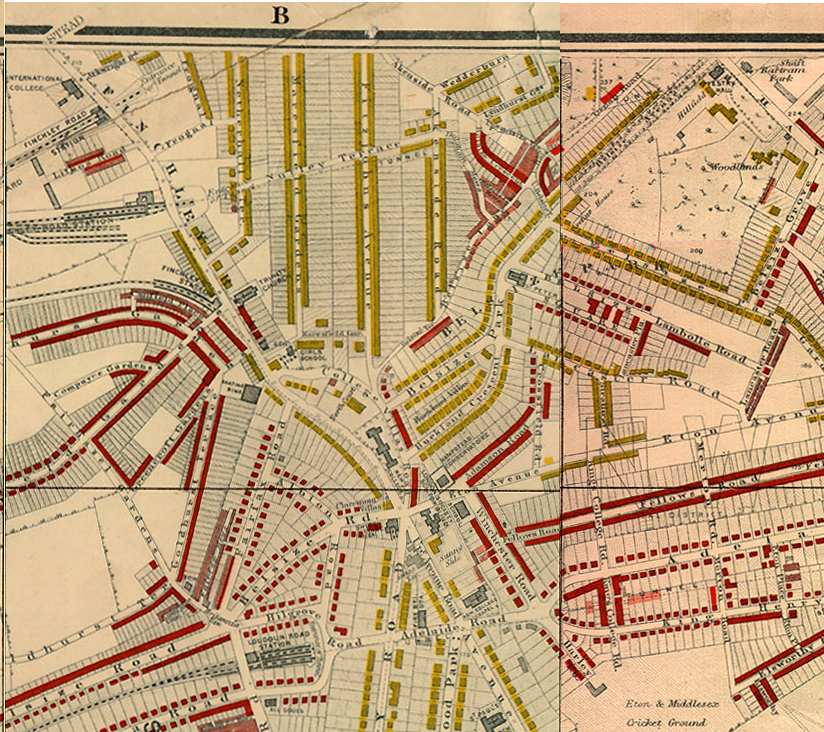
Finchley Road, Belsize Park, Frognal and "Swiss Inn" in Hampstead in Charles Booth's colour coded property map. Red = Middle-class. Well-to-do. Gold = Upper-middle and Upper class. Wealthy. As shown, the district dates to at least the 1890s when this map was made.

A map showing the Belsize Ward of Hampstead MB in 1916

The name is derived from French bel assis meaning "well situated". The area has many thoroughfares bearing its name: Belsize Avenue, Belsize Court, Belsize Crescent, Belsize Gardens, Belsize Grove, Belsize Lane, Belsize Mews, Belsize Park (the road), Belsize Park Gardens, Belsize Place, Belsize Square, and Belsize Terrace.

The Manor of Belsize dates back to 1317, when as a subdivision to the Manor of Hampstead it was left to the Roman Catholic monks of Westminster Abbey. The original manor consisted of a number of subdivided farms, which were rented out for income. After the Reformation, King Henry VIII returned the estate to the Anglican Dean of Westminster Abbey. By 1600, including the manor house of Belsize House there were at least three other properties on the estate, with diplomat and courtier Sir Isaac Wake (1581 – 1632) having a substantial property built on the west side of the main London to Hampstead road. Inherited by his daughter and her husband, Charles West (1626–1687), the fifth Baron de la Warr, by 1714 it had passed through various hands into the ownership of William Paget, the 6th Baron Paget, who had a substantial formal garden constructed.

The name Belsize Park comes from the 17th-century manor house and parkland (built by Daniel O'Neill for his wife, the Countess of Chesterfield) which once stood on the site. Rebuilt in 1663, it was sublet by 1721, when the parklands opened as pleasure gardens for those looking to escape the dirt and grime of the City of London, with concerts, singing, dancing and country sports such as fishing and racing. In 1722 magistrates were instructed to act to stop riotous behaviour, although the parkland remained open until 1745. Belsize House was rebuilt in 1746, after which additional large country houses were built on the surrounding farmlands for wealthy lawyers and merchants.

Between 1679 and 1714, the number of houses on the estate had increased from 8 to 14, and by 1808 there were still only 22 recorded. However, the formal division of the estate in 1808 into eight separate parcels of land, based on the structure of the underleases of the estate's formal houses, allowed the church to maximise its income, by allowing additional substantial houses to be built on the lands. This income allowed the church to have Belsize House rebuilt in 1812 for additional letting income. The wealthy leaseholders soon enabled themselves to purchase the freehold from the church, allowing the accelerated development of Belsize as a Victorian country urban suburb of London. One of the new landowners, George Todd, redeveloped what was known as the White House in 1815 as a substantial Georgian stucco villa with portico and two lodges. Known as Belsize House. It was later sold to Matthew Forster (1786–1869), the Whig MP for Berwick-upon-Tweed, as Belsize Lodge; it was demolished in 1937.

=== Victorian era ===
Victorian development started along the main London to Hampstead road from 1815 through the works of Edward Bliss, a self-made man who had leased and then bought the Newman's House land, on the west side of Haverstock Hill north of England's Lane. Bliss not only built properties to lease out, but also allowed construction subleases. In 1829 Eton College advertised villa-sized plots on Haverstock Hill. The college then started developing an axis road to Finchley Road, naming it after Queen Adelaide. Development halted in the 1830s due to the proposal for the lines of the London and Birmingham Railway (L&BR) to be built through Belsize Park, but Eton College successfully lobbied for the railway to be tunnelled underground via Primrose Hill, which was then designed and engineered by Robert Stephenson. All the 38 houses on the Newman's House land had been built by 1830.

The passing of the Ecclesiastical Leases Act 1842 allowed all church lands to be let on long term construction leases, which unlocked the accelerated urban development of Belsize Park. The opening in 1851 of Hampstead Road railway station on the L&BR prompted William Lund in 1852 to agree a 99-year construction sublease on the former Forsyth estate. He proposed developments to the west of Haverstock Hill, although his plans were curtailed by construction issues associated with building over both the Pond Street sewer and the L&BR tunnel. In 1852 Charles James Palmer, a Bloomsbury-based solicitor bought the lease of Belsize House. In 1853 he proposed demolition of the main house, with Daniel Tiley taking the lead role in constructing Belsize Square and associated properties. Palmer commissioned architect James Piers St Aubyn to design St Peter's Church. In 1864 the church bought back the lease on the undeveloped backlot of the Bliss lands. Tiley gained agreement from Palmer and Eton College to buy the construction lease from the church, and hence extend development south of Belsize Square to connect with the college's estate. Mimicking the then fashionable styles of Kensington and Bayswater, between 1851 and the late 1860s he built over 250 8-10 bedroom semi-detached stucco houses with large porticos, aimed at the middle classes. The church undertook a similar agreement in 1857, reacquiring full control over the portion of Todd's lease north of Belsize Lane in 1865, and again selling it to Tiley. With construction almost complete, fashion changed and Tiley went bankrupt in 1870.

Of the original eight parcels of land defined by the church in 1808, the three leased to Thomas Roberts remained substantially undeveloped throughout much of the Victorian era. South End Farm continued as a farmhouse, whilst although Rosslyn House was sold in 1816 to the undertenant, it remained in place with its formal gardens until the house was demolished between 1896 and 1909. In 1855 Henry Davidson exchanged his lease for life of the Rosslyn House lands for a 99-year building lease. Due to issues associated with construction over the L&BR tunnels, in 1859 he sold Rosslyn House and its extended formal gardens to Charles Henry Lardner Woodd. Woodd decided to sublease the house out for income. Its occupiers until 1893 included Sir Francis Freeling (1764–1836), Secretary of the General Post Office, and General Sir Moore Disney. Davidson developed his part of the Rosslyn lands, undertaking a mixed development of large semi-detached properties similar to Belsize Park, slowed by a lack of labour due to both the substantial development of the neighbouring Maryon Wilson land and the 1860s housing rush. Woodd endeavoured to keep the ever-encroaching tide of housing from coming too close to Rosslyn House, permitting development only on the fringes of the formal garden, such as the housing by the local architect Horace Field on the south side of Wedderburn Road. It was only after Woodd's death in 1895, and the sale of the house to developers by his widow the following year, that development took place on the north side of Wedderburn Road and elsewhere on the garden and site of the house. At 19-21 Lyndhurst Road (1898) the development incorporated the gatehouse of Rosslyn House, designed for Woodd by S. S. Teulon, the architect of St Stephen's Church, Rosslyn Hill.

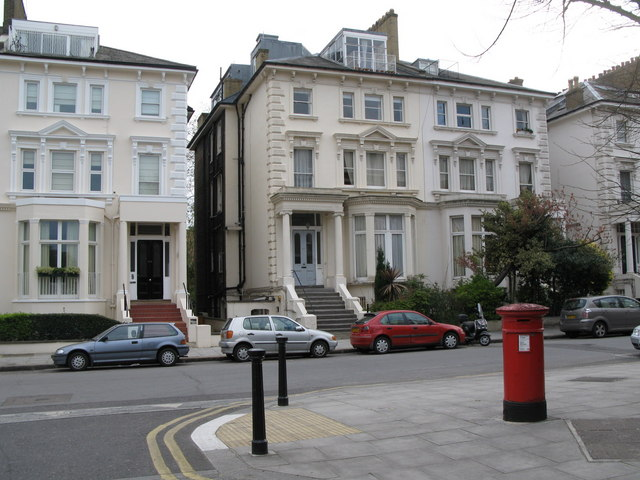
Victorian houses in Belsize Park Gardens.

Developing housing resulted in the need for improved transport facilities, including Hampstead Heath, Finchley Road, and Swiss Cottage stations. From 1873 William Willett (the father of William Willett the tireless promoter of British Summer Time, who helped his father from 1881 onwards) took over the church's leases after the bankruptcy of Daniel Tiley. Willett redeveloped much of the former Eton College estate with newer, smaller but still substantial properties inspired by Queen Anne style architecture. By 1900, most of the residual country mansions and their gardens had been demolished, to make way for smaller terraced houses.

=== Modern era ===
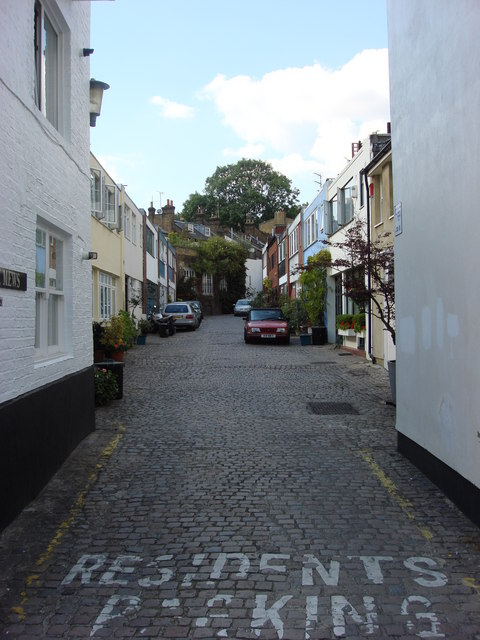
Belsize Park Mews

After World War I, the construction of blocks of flats began, and now a great many of the larger houses are also converted into flats. In World War II, a large underground air-raid shelter was built here, and its entrance can still be seen near the tube station at Downside Crescent. The area on Haverstock Hill north of Belsize Park Underground station up to Hampstead Town Hall and including part of a primary school near the Royal Free Hospital was heavily bombed. When the area was rebuilt, the opportunity was taken to widen the pavement and build further back from the road.

== Cultural references ==
The lyrics of the international chart hit "Kayleigh" by rock band Marillion in 1985 include the line "loving on the floor in Belsize Park". It is also in the short film Les Bicyclettes de Belsize (although mainly filmed in Hampstead Village), of which the title song was covered by Mireille Mathieu, Engelbert Humperdinck, and others. Belsize Park is also referenced on Sleeper's 1995 debut album Smart in the song "Lady Love Your Countryside" with the lyrics "And we could spend our lives puking in Belsize Park". Cozy Powell's 1974 single "Na Na Na" suggests that "You're a wizard of Wembley Central, You're the J. S. Bach of Belsize Park".

The Belsize Park London Underground station features in the song "Paradise" by Coldplay, where in the video, the elephant can be seen taking a train from the station.

The Camden Town Group artist Robert Polhill Bevan and his wife Stanislawa de Karlowska lived at 14 Adamson Road from 1900 to 1925.

Kirsty MacColl's 2000 song "England 2 Colombia 0" features the line, "we went to a pub in Belsize Park and cheered on England as the skies grew dark..."

It is also the place of residence for the Jewish community targeted by Hitler in the 1930s in the novel The Morning Gift.

Novelist Peter Straub entitled his 1983 poetry collection "Leeson Square and Belsize Park" in part after his time in residence in the Belsize Park district of London. Belsize Park and the surrounding quarters were the setting for a long-running radio drama, Waggoner's Walk. This daily serial ran from April 1969 to May 1980 each weekday on BBC Radio 2. Belsize Park is mentioned in the Hitchcock thriller, Dial M for Murder (1954) by the lead character Tony Wendice, played by Ray Milland, when coercing his accomplice C. A. Swann into murdering his wife.

Shooting of the late-night scene when Paltrow and Hannah walk down the street from the 1998 film Sliding Doors was filmed in Primrose Gardens (formerly Stanley Gardens) in Belsize Park.

== Sport ==
There are records of a Belsize Park Rugby Club in North-West London since the 1860s. In 1871, Belsize was one of the clubs at the inaugural meeting of the Rugby Football Union, and therefore pioneers of the game of Rugby Union. In 1878, Belsize moved to form Rosslyn Park RFC, becoming one of England's leading clubs. In 1971, Belsize Park RFC was re-established by a group of local players. The club is now one of the most central of all London Rugby Clubs, playing and training in Regent's Park. There are five regular teams playing every Saturday during the season as well as a touch rugby squad in the summer time.

== Notable residents ==
Belsize Park has long attracted figures from the arts, media, and public life, drawn in part by its proximity to central London, village-like character, and access to green spaces such as Hampstead Heath and Primrose Hill. Over the decades, the area has been associated with a number of notable residents from film, music, literature, and politics.
- James Agate, drama critic, at Antrim Mansions
- Walter Bergmann, émigré musician, at 28 Belsize Square
- Helena Bonham-Carter, actress, in Chalcot Gardens
- Marcel Breuer, designer, Isokon Flats
- Harold Brighouse, writer, at 67 Parliament Hill
- Jonny Buckland, lead guitarist of Coldplay
- Tim Burton, filmmaker and animator, in Chalcot Gardens
- Agatha Christie, writer, Isokon Flats
- Frederick Delius, composer, in Belsize Park Gardens
- Nick Drake, musician, at 112 Haverstock Hill
- John Drinkwater, poet, at 10 Belsize Square
- William Empson, poet, at 160 Haverstock Hill
- Martin Freeman, actor
- Naum Gabo, sculptor, Isokon Flats
- Noel Gallagher, musician and songwriter, at 8 Steele's Road
- Stella Gibbons, journalist, poet, and writer, at 33 Upper Park Road
- Walter Gropius, founder of German Art school Bauhaus, architect, Isokon Flats
- Hazel Hunkins Hallinan, Suffragette
- Barbara Hepworth, sculptor
- Alice Herz-Sommer, 110-year-old Holocaust survivor
- Tom Hiddleston, actor
- Rowland Hill, inventor of the postage stamp, at Bartrams, Hampstead Green (now the site of the Royal Free Hospital car park)
- Leslie Hutchinson, singer, at 31 Steele's Road
- Jerome K. Jerome, writer, at 41 Belsize Park
- E. Ray Lankester at 68 Belsize Park
- Hugh Laurie, actor, at Lancaster Grove
- Jude Law, actor, in Belsize Park
- Ramsay MacDonald, politician, at 9 Howitt Road
- John Maple at Bedford Lodge, 151 Haverstock Hill
- Karl Marx, 19th-century political philosopher, at 41 Maitland Park Road
- Sylvester McCoy, actor, in Savernake Road
- David Mitchell, comedian, actor and writer, and Victoria Coren Mitchell, broadcaster and poker player
- László Moholy-Nagy, sculptor, Isokon Flats
- Piet Mondrian, painter, at 60 Parkhill Road
- Nicholas Monsarrat, writer, Isokon Flats
- Henry Moore, sculptor, at 11A Parkhill Road
- Paul Nash, at 3 Eldon Grove
- Henry W. Nevinson, essayist, at 4 Downshire Crescent
- Rita Ora, singer and songwriter, in Chalcot Gardens
- Adrian Stokes, painter and writer, Isokon Flats
- William Heath Strange, physician and founder of the Hampstead General Hospital, now the Royal Free Hospital, at 2 Belsize Avenue
- Wolfgang Suschitzky, an Austrian-British cinematographer and photographer
- Edith Tudor-Hart, an Austrian-British photographer
- Michelle Visage, American television personality
