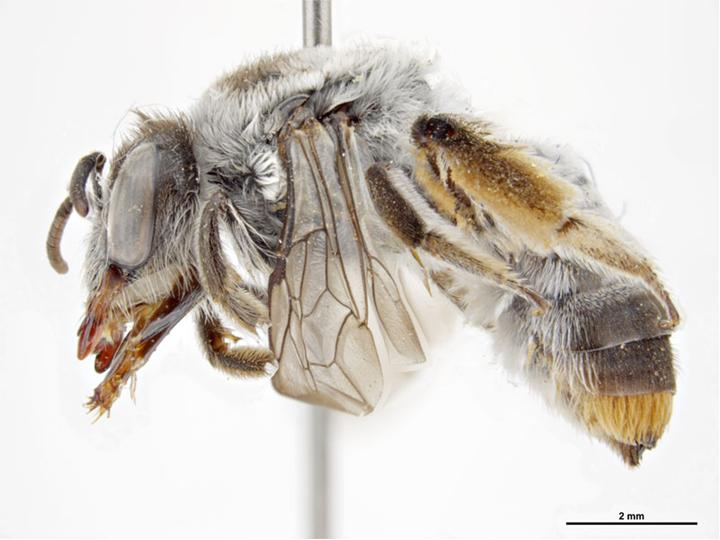
- Female

Scientific classification
- Kingdom: Animalia
- Phylum: Arthropoda
- Clade: Pancrustacea
- Class: Insecta
- Order: Hymenoptera
- Family: Colletidae
- Genus: Leioproctus
- Species: L. erythropyga

Binomial name
- Leioproctus erythropyga Maynard 1997

= Leioproctus erythropyga =

Species of bee

Leioproctus erythropyga, or Leioproctus (Odontocolletes) erythropyga, is a species of bee in the family Colletidae and subfamily Colletinae. It is endemic to Australia. It was described by Australian entomologist Glynn Maynard in 1997.

== Etymology ==
The specific epithet erythropyga (Latin: "red-rumped") is an anatomical reference to the distinctive caudal colouration.

== Description ==
Female body length is 9 mm, male body length 9 mm. Integumental colouration is mainly black, with orange-red on the female caudal fimbria and the posterior segments of the male metasoma.

== Distribution and habitat ==
The species occurs in arid western and central Australia. The type locality is 8 km north of Kulgera, Northern Territory.

== Behaviour ==
The adults are flying mellivores. Flowering plants visited by the bees include Eremophila freelingii.

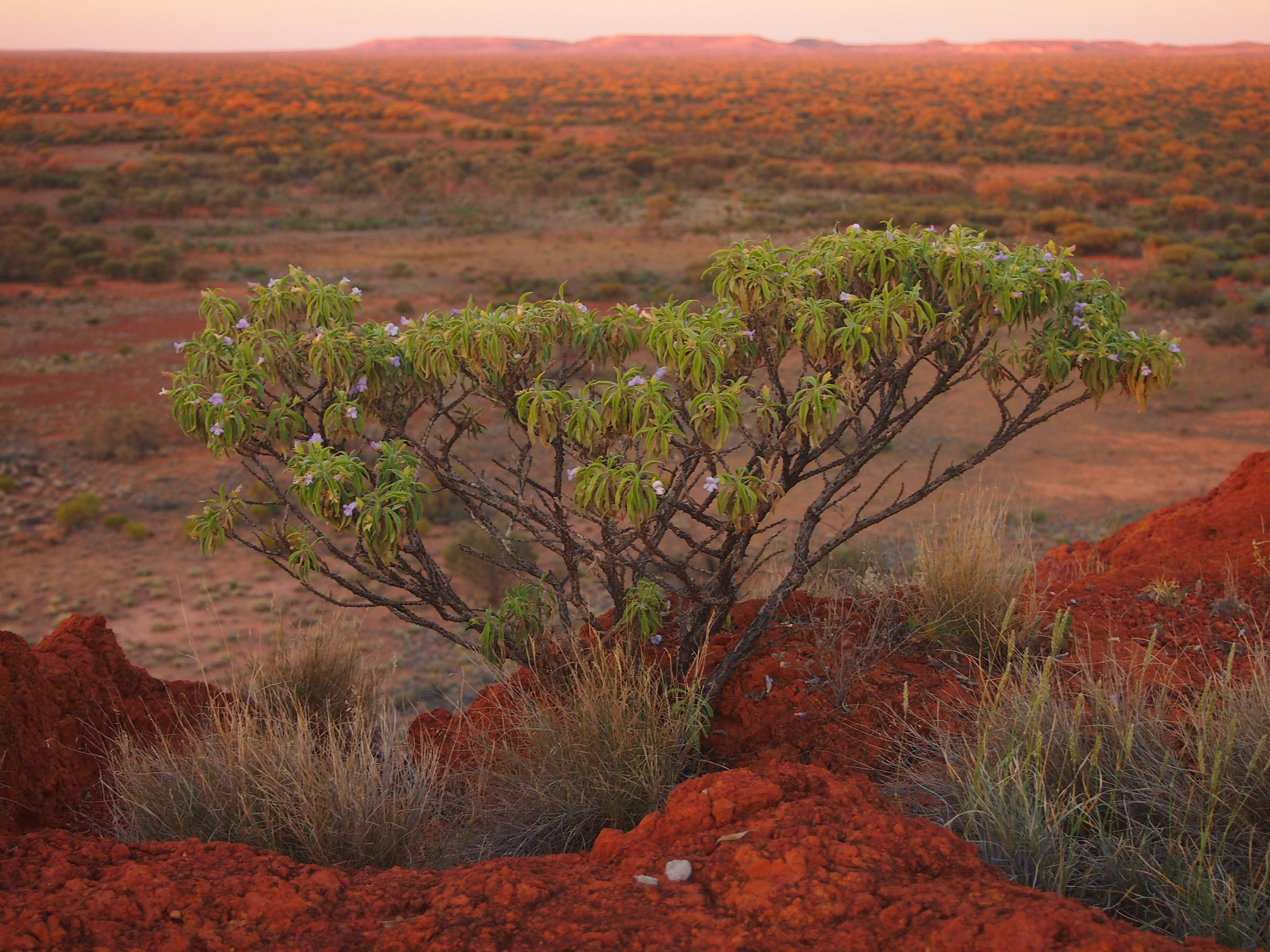
Eremophila freelingii (rock fuchsia bush), a forage plant of the bees

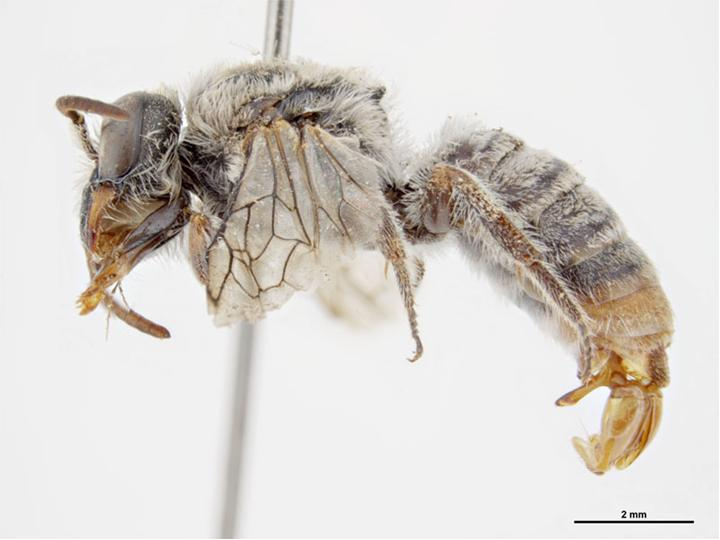
Male
