= Lyndhurst Road =

Street in Hamstead, England

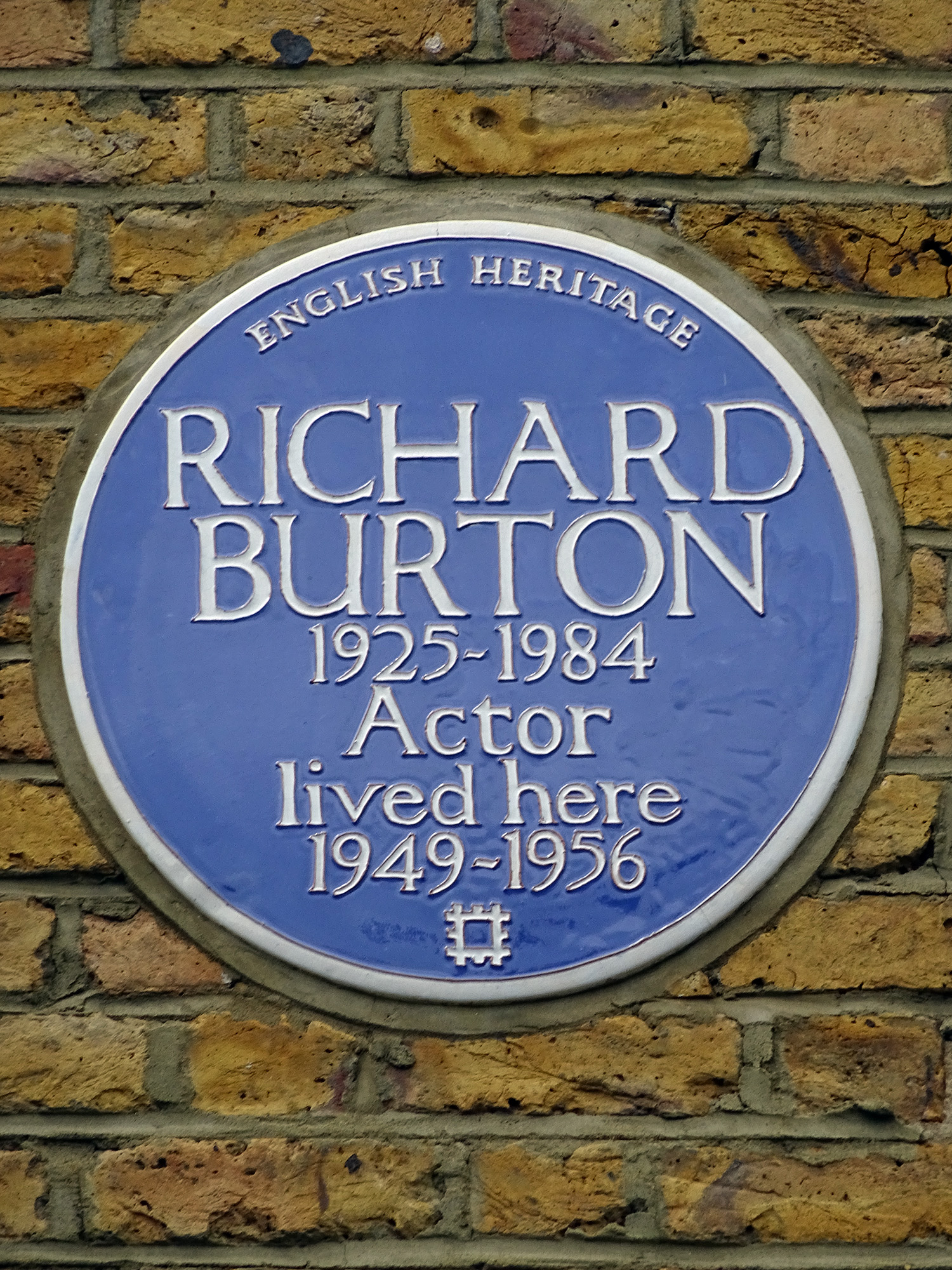
Blue plaque on the former residence of actor Richard Burton.

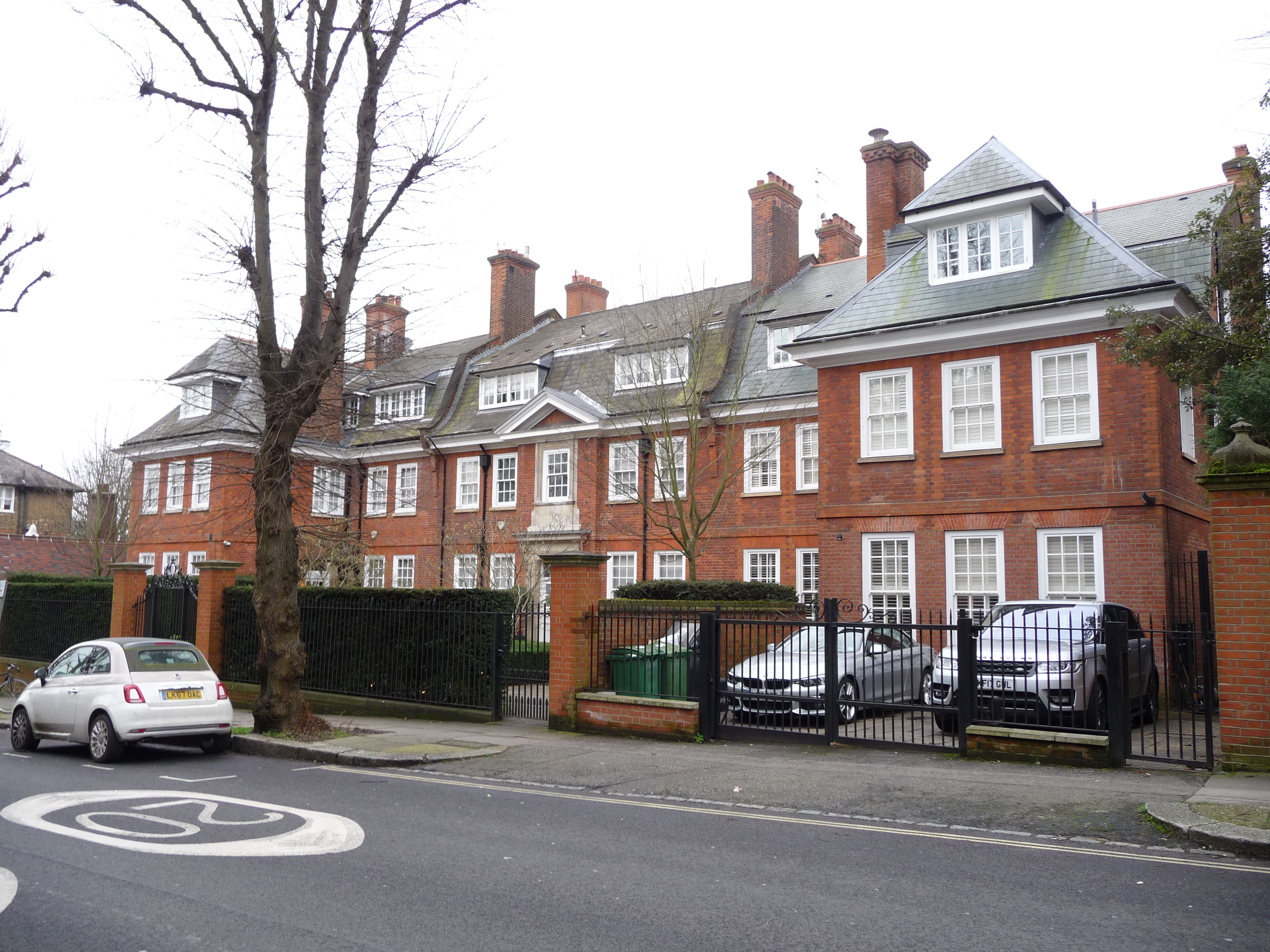
19–21 Lyndhurst Road.

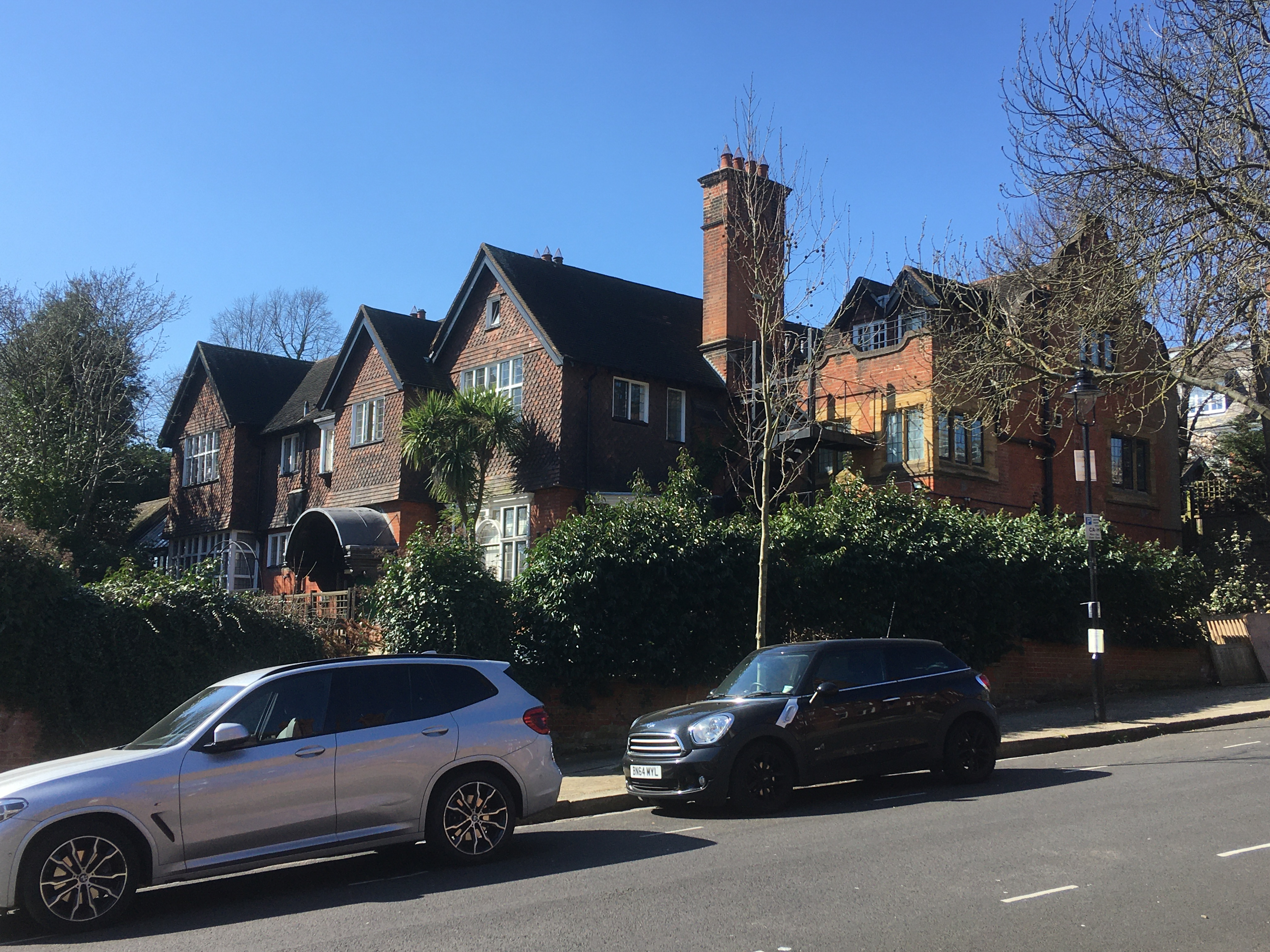
The Hoo, Hampstead. A listed building on Lyndhurst Gardens.

Lyndhurst Road is a residential street in the Belsize Park area of Hampstead. Located in the London Borough of Camden it runs west to east, linking Fitzjohns Avenue to Rosslyn Hill. Until the nineteenth century it was a rural area on the outskirts of the capital, occupied by Rosslyn House and its estate. As London expanded the Rosslyn House estate, as well as nearby Belsize House, were redeveloped into residential streets. The oldest stretch of Lyndhurst Road was laid out in 1862. It follows the route of Chestnut Walk (also known as Rosslyn Grove) a much older approach towards Rosslyn House.

Rosslyn House, once an important country estate, was finally demolished in 1896 after much of its estate had already been sold off for redevelopment. Its gatehouse, designed by S.S. Teulon, was incorporated into the design of Nos. 19-21 by Horace Field. The street takes its name from Lord Lyndhurst, the American-born politician and judge. This follows a theme of naming nearby streets after Lord Chancellors, due to the fact that Rosslyn House was named after a former owner Earl of Rosslyn, who had held the post in the 1790s. The Victorian era Lyndhurst Hall in Kentish Town took its name from the street and the Congregationalist Church originally located in the road.

Notable residents have included the politician Russell Rea, the artist Carl Haag and the actor Richard Burton. The latter is commemorated by a blue plaque at 6 Lyndhurst Road, erected in 2011. Two adjacent streets share their name with the road Lyndhurst Terrace and Lyndhurst Gardens. The latter features a number of listed buildings, including The Hoo, also designed by Horace Field.

== See also ==
- Lyndhurst Terrace, a street in Hong Kong named after Lord Lyndhurst

== Bibliography ==
- Cherry, Bridget & Pevsner, Nikolaus. London 4: North. Yale University Press, 2002.
- Wade, Christopher. The Streets of Belsize. Camden History Society, 1991.
