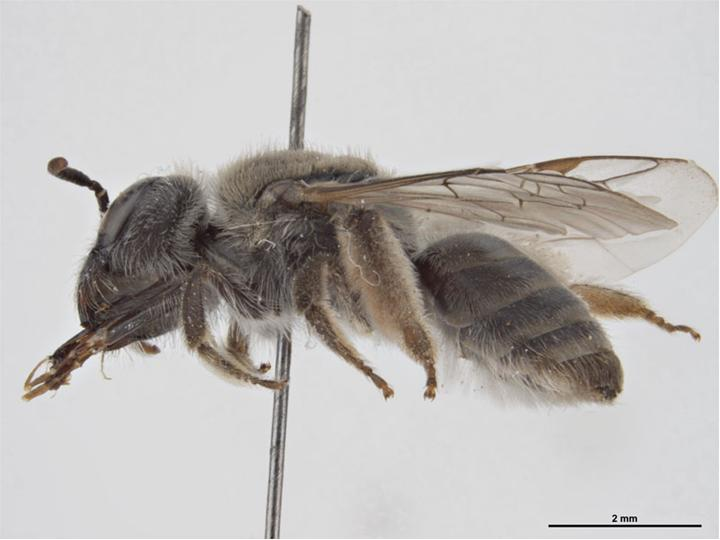
- Female

Scientific classification
- Kingdom: Animalia
- Phylum: Arthropoda
- Clade: Pancrustacea
- Class: Insecta
- Order: Hymenoptera
- Family: Colletidae
- Genus: Leioproctus
- Species: L. eremitulus

Binomial name
- Leioproctus eremitulus Houston, 1990

= Leioproctus eremitulus =

Species of bee

Leioproctus eremitulus, or Leioproctus (Leioproctus) eremitulus, is a species of bee in the family Colletidae and subfamily Colletinae. It is endemic to Australia. It was described by Australian entomologist Terry Houston in 1990.

== Etymology ==
The specific epithet eremitulus (Latin: "of the desert") is a habitat and forage plant reference.

== Description ==
The male holotype body length is about 6.5 mm, head width 1.85 mm; female paratype body length is about 8 mm, head width 2.25 mm. Integumental colouration is mainly black; the hair is white to off-white and buff.

== Distribution and habitat ==
The species occurs in arid central Australia. The type locality is 45 km east-north-east of Dalhousie Homestead, in the Far North region of South Australia.

== Behaviour ==
The adults are flying mellivores. Flowering plants visited by the bees include Eremophila freelingii and Ruellia species.

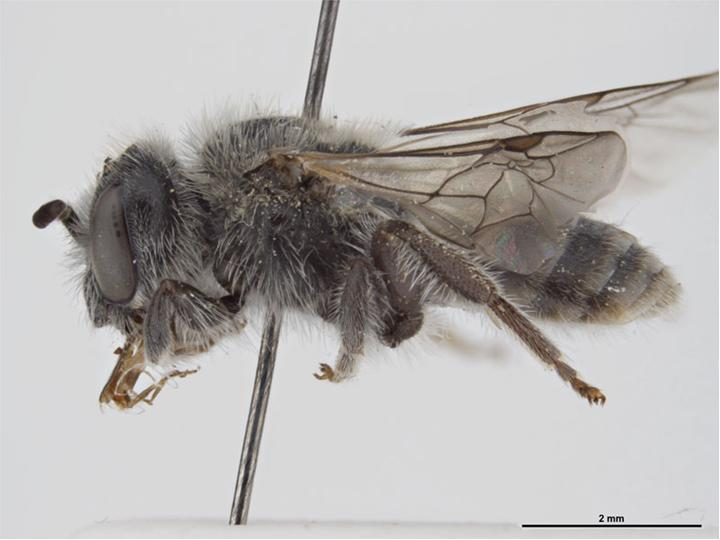
Male

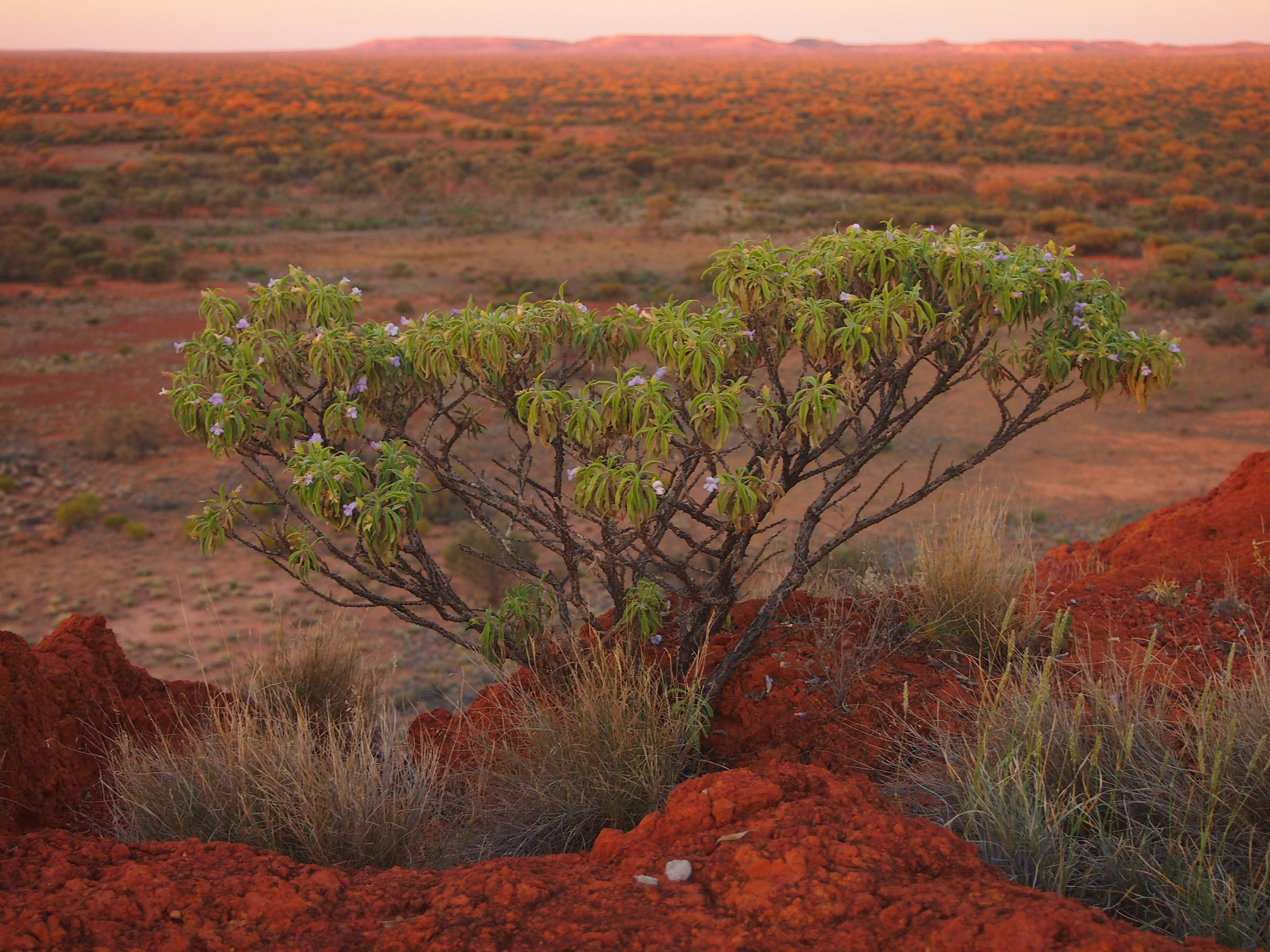
Eremophila freelingii (rock fuchsia bush), a forage plant of the bees
