= Grand Hotel and Spa (York) =

Listed building in York, England

The Grand
- The building in 2026
- Former names: Grand Hotel and Spa

General information
- Location: Station Rise, York, England
- Coordinates: 53°57′31.83″N 1°5′21.03″W
- Opening: 2010
- Owner: Splendid Hospitality Group

Design and construction
- Architects: Horace Field, William Bell

Other information
- Number of rooms: 207
- Number of suites: 13
- Number of restaurants: 2

Website
- thegrandyork.co.uk

Listed Building – Grade II*
- Official name: Former North Eastern Railway Company Offices and area railings attached
- Designated: 24 June 1983
- Reference no.: 1256400

The Grand, formerly the Grand Hotel and Spa, is a Grade II* listed hotel in York, England, the city's only 5-star hotel. Opened in May 2010 and renovated and extended in 2017–18, it is an Edwardian building dating to 1906, originally the headquarters of the North Eastern Railway, with views of the York city walls and York Minster. It is owned by Splendid Hospitality Group.

== History ==
The Grand's building opened in 1906, as the headquarters of the North Eastern Railway (then one of the richest businesses in Britain); The NER's architect William Bell produced the basic structural design and commissioned architect Horace Field worked on the external and internal design. It is believed their design won a silver medal at an exhibition in Paris in 1904. Construction took place between 1900 and 1906.

The hotel opened in 2010 as the Cedar Court Grand Hotel & Spa, after the building was purchased in 2007 and refurbished by Cedar Court Group. Splendid Hospitality Group bought it in 2014 and in 2017–18 refurbished and expanded it.

The main facade

== Facilities ==
The hotel opened with 107 rooms (13 suites), a spa, two restaurants (The Rise, and the 3 AA-rosette Legacy), and business meeting facilities for up to 120 people. In the 2010s expansion, the number of rooms was increased to 207, and the White Rose Lounge was added.

The boardroom won the "best boardroom/small meeting room" award at the 2017 Conference Hospitality Awards.

== Management ==
The general manager is Simon Mahon.

== See also ==
- Grade II* listed buildings in the City of York
- Listed buildings in York (within the city walls, southern part)
