= Chalcot Crescent =

Street in Primrose Hill, London, England

Coordinates: 51.54017°N 0.15591°W

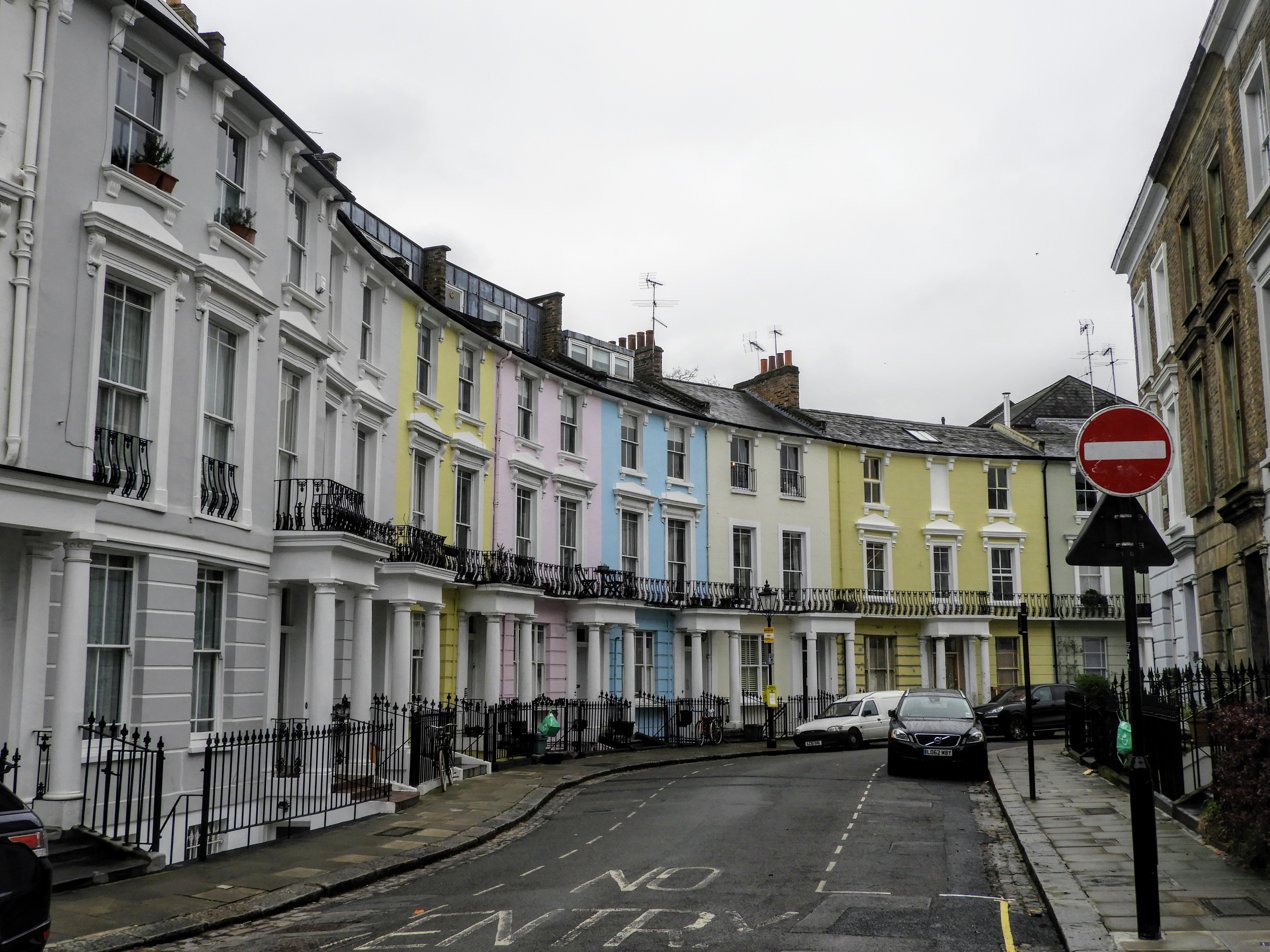
Chalcot Crescent

Chalcot Crescent is a street in Primrose Hill, London, England.

The street has an unusually meandering and free-flowing shape for a crescent. It runs between Regent's Park Road and Sharples Hall Street. Like nearby Chalcot Square it was laid out between 1849 and 1860, with most of the development taking place around 1855. Both sites occupy land that once belonged to the old Chalcot estate - the name of which gave rise to Chalk Farm. The three-story terraced houses are known for their brightly coloured stucco facades and cast-iron balconies and railings with fleur-de-lys finials.

The street lies within the Primrose Hill Conservation Area and most of the houses are Grade II listed.

The street features in the Paddington film series as the home of the Brown family (where it is renamed Windsor Gardens). The novel Chalcot Crescent by Fay Weldon is named after the street.

The architect Horace Field and the photographer Harry Bedford Lemere were born on the street. The writer and national hero of the Philippines, José Rizal, lived at 37 Chalcot Crescent. The broadcaster Mary Portas lives on the street.
