= James Freeling =

English cricketer

The Reverend Sir James Freeling Bt
- Born: 3 June 1825; Marylebone, Middlesex, England
- Died: 30 October 1916 (aged 91); Brussels, Belgium
- Education: Winchester College; Exeter College, Oxford; University College, Durham (BA)
- Cricket career

Personal information
- Full name: James Robert Freeling
- Batting: Unknown

Domestic team information
- Years: Team
- 1843: Marylebone Cricket Club
- 1844: Oxford University

Career statistics
Competition	First-class
Matches	3
Runs scored	34
Batting average	5.66
100s/50s	–/–
Top score	18
Catches/stumpings	1/–
- Source: Cricinfo, 3 May 2020

Sir James Robert Freeling, 7th Baronet (3 June 1825 – 30 October 1916) was an English first-class cricketer and clergyman.

The son of John Clayton Freeling, he was born at Marylebone in June 1825. He was educated at Winchester College, before going up to Exeter College, Oxford in 1844. A year prior to going to Oxford, Freeling had made his debut in first-class cricket for the Marylebone Cricket Club (MCC) against Oxford University at Bullingdon, also playing for the MCC in return fixture at Lord's. In 1844, he made a single appearances for Oxford University against the MCC at Lord's. He scored a total of 34 runs in his three first-class matches, with a high score of 18. He transferred from Exeter College to University College, Durham, where he completed his studies.

After leaving Durham, Freeling took holy orders in the Church of England. His first ecclesiastical post was at Ely, where he was a deacon in 1852. Later in 1852, he was appointed curate at Farley in Wiltshire, a post he held until 1855. In 1861, he became the curate of Sharnbrook, Bedfordshire which he held until 1868. After holding ecclesiastical posts in England, Freeling held posts on the continent, at Chantilly in France from 1868 to 1870, Brussels in Belgium from 1870 to 1877, and Bonn in Germany from 1878 to 1882. He succeeded his cousin, Sir Harry Freeling, as the 7th Baronet of the Freeling baronets in 1914. Freeling died at Brussels in October 1916 and upon his death, he was succeeded as the 8th Baronet by Sir Clayton Freeling.

Baronetage of the United Kingdom
Preceded by Sir Harry Freeling	Baronet (of the General Post Office and of Ford and Hutchings); 1914–1916	Succeeded by Sir Clayton Freeling
