= Freeling baronets =

Title in the Baronetage of the United Kingdom

Escutcheon of the Freeling baronets

The Freeling Baronetcy, of the General Post Office in the City of London and Ford and Hutchings in the County of Sussex, was a title in the Baronetage of the United Kingdom. It was created on 11 March 1828 for Francis Freeling, Secretary of HM General Post Office. The title became extinct on the death of the ninth Baronet in 1941.

== Freeling baronets, of the General Post Office and of Ford and Hutchings (1828) ==
- Sir Francis Freeling, 1st Baronet (1764–1836)
- Sir George Henry Freeling, 2nd Baronet (1789–1841)
- Sir Francis Freeling, 3rd Baronet (1816–1845)
- Sir Henry Hill Freeling, 4th Baronet (1818–1871)
- Sir Arthur Henry Freeling, 5th Baronet (1820–1885)
- Sir Harry Freeling, 6th Baronet (1852–1914)
- Sir James Robert Freeling, 7th Baronet (1825–1916)
- Sir Clayton Pennington Freeling, 8th Baronet (1857–1927)
- Sir Charles Edward Luard Freeling, 9th Baronet (1858–1941). He left no heir.

Baronetage of the United Kingdom
Preceded by Williams-Drummond baronets	Freeling baronets of the General Post Office and of Ford and Hutchings; 11 March 1828	Succeeded by Laffan baronets
