= James Heywood Markland =

James Heywood Markland (1788–1864) was an English solicitor and antiquary.

== Life ==
Born at Ardwick Green, Manchester, 7 December 1788, he was the fourth and youngest son of Robert Markland, a textile manufacturer there; his mother was Elizabeth, daughter of Robert Hibbert of Manchester. At age 11 he was sent for his education to the house of the headmaster of Chester school.

Markland was trained as a solicitor in Manchester, but in 1808 roved to London and practised there. In 1814 he was appointed by the West India planters their parliamentary agent, and in the same year entered as a student at the Inner Temple. He remained in London in practice, being the head partner in the firm of Markland & Wright, until 1839, when he retired to Malvern. In 1841 he moved to Bath, Somerset and spent the rest of his life there.

Markland was elected Fellow of the Society of Antiquaries of London in 1809, and from 1827 to April 1829, when he resigned the post, acted as its director. He joined the Roxburghe Club at its second meeting (1813), when it was enlarged to 24 members, in 1816 became Fellow of the Royal Society, and on 21 June 1849 was created D.C.L. of the University of Oxford.

Markland co-owned with John and Thomas Hibbert four sugar plantations in Jamaica and Barbados. When the British government emancipated the slaves in the 1830s, Markland and his partners received compensation to the tune of over £25,000 each for the liberation of over 400 slaves in their ownership. In a 2023 article by The Guardian, Markland's contributions to the West India Interest as its secretary and solicitor were described as "pivotal to pro-slavery politics" in Britain.

Also a supporter of church societies, Markland was entrusted by Mrs. Ramsden with the foundation of mission sermons in Cambridge and Oxford, and while he was resident in Bath three ladies, the Misses Mitford of Somerset Place, selected him for the distribution of £14,000 in charitable works in England and the colonies.

Markland died at his house, Lansdown Crescent, Bath, on 28 December 1864, and was buried in the new Walcot cemetery on 3 January 1866, the first window in Bath Abbey west of the transept being filled with glass to his memory. His library was dispersed at his death.

== Works ==
Markland wrote:

- A Few Plain Reasons for Adhering to the Church (anon.), 1807.
- A Letter to Lord Aberdeen, President of the Society of Antiquaries, on the expediency of Establishing a Museum of Antiquities, 1828. It was reprinted in the Gentleman's Magazine, 1828, pt. i. pp. 61–64.
- A Few Words on the Sin of Lying (anon.), 1834.
- Sketch of the Life and Character of George Hibbert (anon.), printed for private distribution, 1837.
- Remarks on Sepulchral Memorials, with Suggestions for Improving the Condition of our Churches, 1840; an enlarged edition of this appeared as Remarks on English Churches and on the expediency of rendering Sepulchral Memorials subservient to Pious and Christian Uses, 1842; 3rd edit. 1843.
- On the Reverence due to Holy Places. By the Author of "Remarks on English Churches" 1845; 3rd edit, much enlarged and preface signed J. H. M., 1846. An abridgment was published in 1862 by the Rev. S. Fox of Morley Rectory, Derbyshire.
- Prayers for Persons coming to the Baths of Bath. By Bishop Ken. With a Life of the Author, 1848. Preface signed M.; 2nd edit., with a brief life of the author by J. H. Markland, 1849; another issue, 1863.
- Diligence and Sloth. By a Layman, 1858. Advertisement signed J. H. M.
- The Offertory the best way of Contributing Money for Christian Purposes; 2nd edit. 1862.

Markland edited for the Roxburghe Club in 1818 a volume of Chester Mysteries, de deluvio Noe, de occisione innocentium; assisted with George Ormerod's History of Cheshire; aided John Britton in his Beauties of England; and contributed articles to the Censura Literaria, the major one being on William Mason and to Notes and Queries.

Markland's assistance was acknowledged in John Nichols's Literary Anecdotes; a paper of his on Abraham and Jeremiah Markland was inserted in the work. He supplied Alexander Chalmers with some particulars of Jeremiah Markland's life. He wrote also in the Archæological Journal, and Archæologia.

== Family ==
On 24 September 1821 Markland married, at Marylebone Church, Charlotte, eldest daughter of Sir Francis Freeling, who died on 9 October 1867. They had a daughter, Elizabeth Jane, who married in 1853 Charles Ranken Conybeare, vicar of Itchen Stoke, Hampshire.

== Notes ==
Attribution

This article incorporates text from a publication now in the public domain: Lee, Sidney, ed. (1893). "Markland, James Heywood". Dictionary of National Biography. Vol. 36. London: Smith, Elder & Co.
