= Michael Bunney =

English architect (1873–1927)

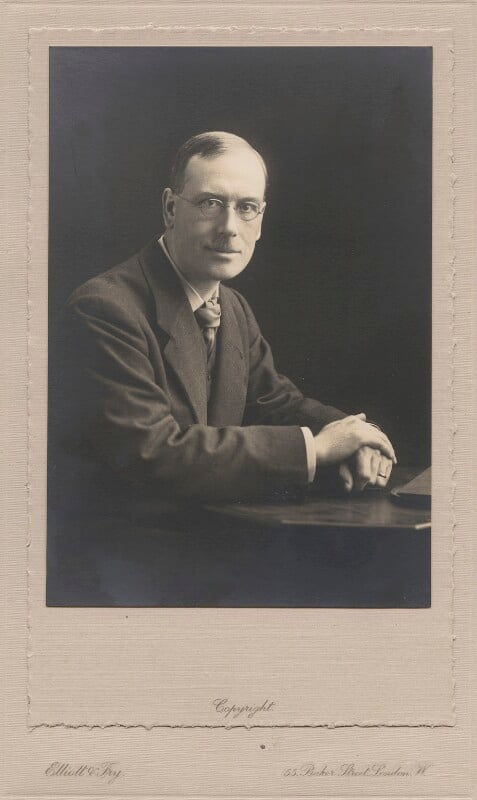
Bunney in the 1910s

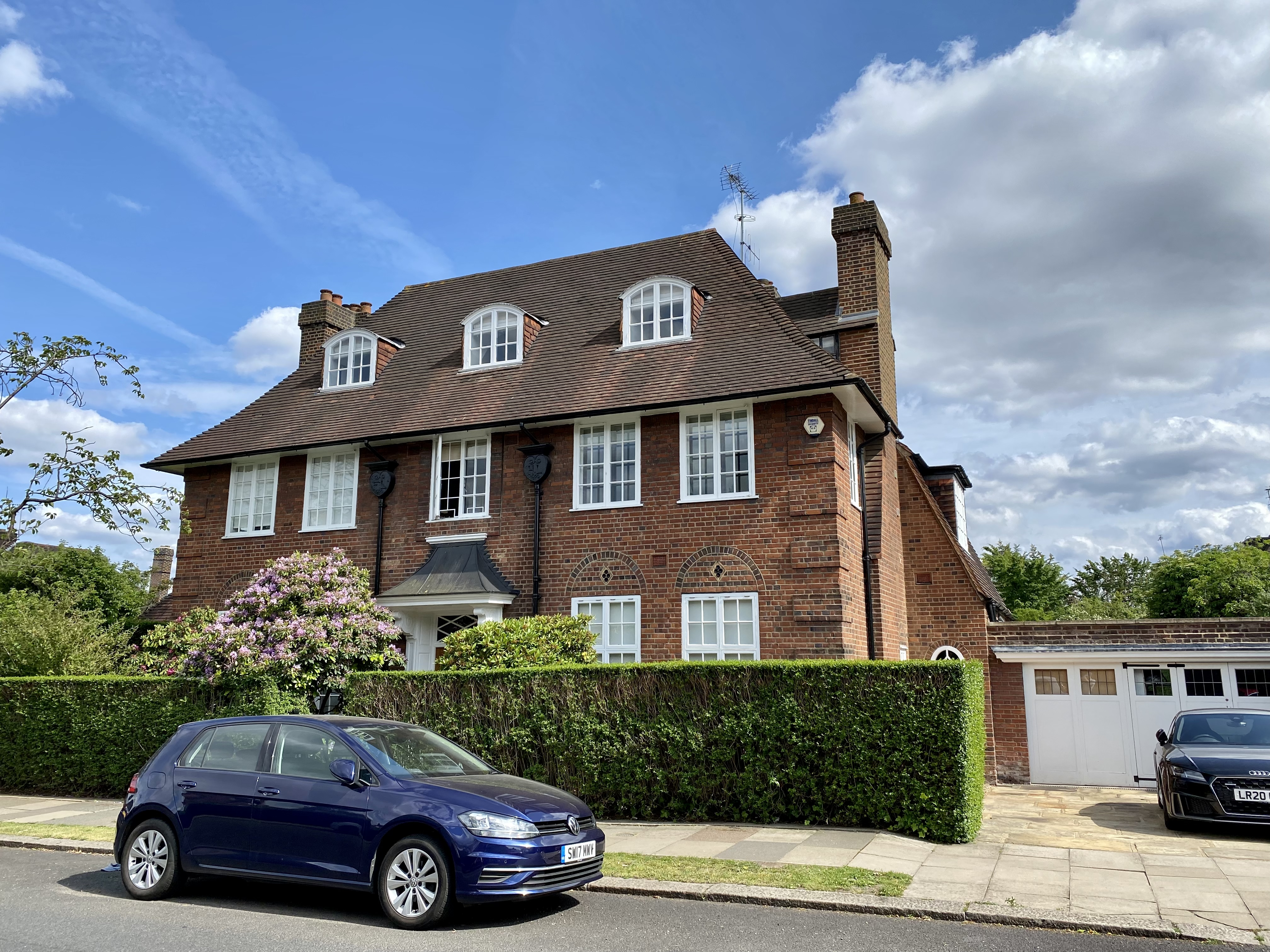
22 Meadway in Hampstead Garden Suburb, designed by Bunney in 1909

Michael Frank Wharlton Bunney MBE (1873–1927) was an English architect who was closely associated with the development of Hampstead Garden Suburb.

He was born in Venice where his father, John Wharlton Bunney, was doing watercolours for John Ruskin and was Venice correspondent for the Society for the Protection of Ancient Buildings. Michael Bunney went to Fettes College, Edinburgh and then studied at the Architectural Association and Royal Academy Schools.

He was articled to Horace Field between 1890 and 1894, becoming his chief assistant between 1895 and 1902, when he went into practice on his own before partnering with Clifford Makins from 1905. He became ARIBA in 1906 and FRIBA 1919 and co-authored, with Horace Field, English domestic architecture of the XVII and XVIII Centuries (pub 1905, rev. ed. 1928). Bunney & Makins designed ninety houses in Hampstead Garden Suburb between 1909 and 1914.

During the First World War he was sent by Raymond Unwin with other Hampstead Garden Suburb architects, to work for the Ministry of Health Architects' Department designing housing and public buildings at the new munitions town of Gretna, Dumfries, for which he was awarded the MBE in 1918. He also undertook town planning and designed a beach pavilion in Prestatyn, Flintshire as well as some individual houses in North Wales. He is often confused with his son, the architect Michael John Hewetson Bunney FRIBA.

Between 1998 and 2002 John and Sarah, the grandchildren of Michael Bunney, donated a large quantity of their grandfather's archive to the National Monuments Record, now the Historic England Archive.

== Selected publications ==
- English Domestic Architecture of the XVII and XVIII Centuries. George Bell and Sons, London, 1905 & 1928. (With Horace Field)
