= Arthur Henry Freeling =

Australian politician and surveyor

Sir Arthur Freeling Bt
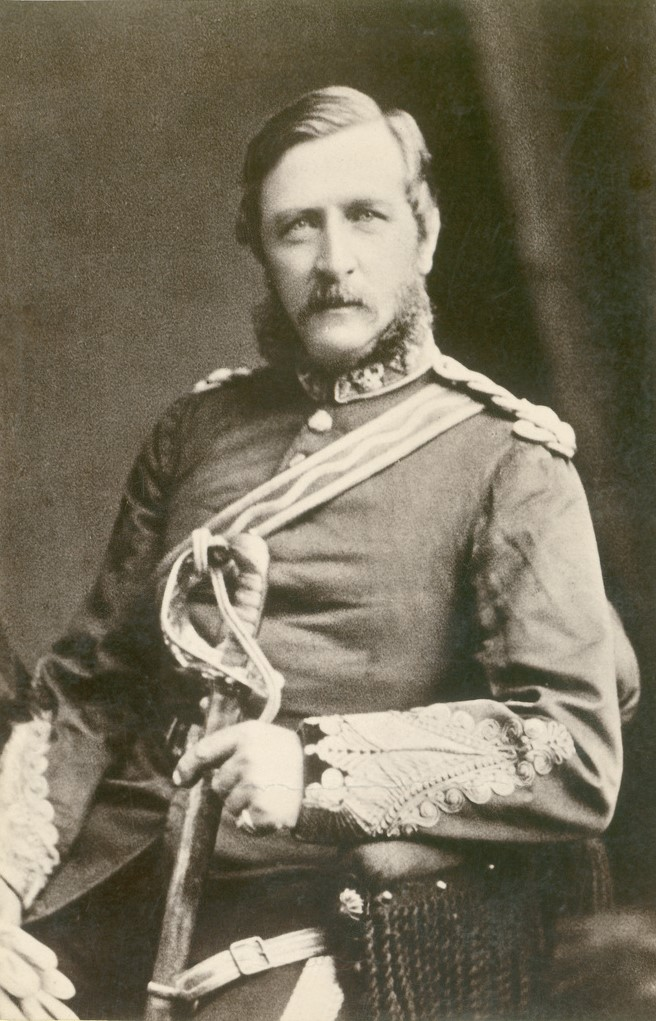

Surveyor General of South Australia
- In office 4 June 1849 – 31 January 1861
- Preceded by: Edward Charles Frome
- Succeeded by: George Goyder

South Australian Commissioner of Public Works
- In office 24 October 1856 – 20 March 1857
- Premier: Boyle Finniss
- Succeeded by: Samuel Davenport

Personal details
- Born: 26 July 1820
- Died: 26 March 1885 (aged 64)

Major-General Sir Arthur Henry Freeling, 5th Baronet (26 July 1820 – 26 March 1885) was the fifth Surveyor General of South Australia.

== Early life ==
Freeling was the son of John Clayton Freeling and grandson of Sir Francis Freeling, Bt, and the elder brother of Sir Sanford Freeling, KCMG. In 1848 Freeling married Charlotte Augusta, daughter of Sir Henry Rivers, 9th Rivers baronet.

== Career ==
Freeling enlisted in the Royal Engineers and later served under the South Australian Government as Surveyor-General. In this capacity he did some valuable exploring work in South Australia. He also served as a member of the Executive and Legislative Councils prior to the concession of responsible government.

In March 1857, Freeling was elected to the newly constituted Legislative Council, where he sat until his resignation in August 1859. He was a member of the Finniss Ministry of South Australia as Commissioner of Public Works from October 1856 to March 1857, when he retired rather than relinquish the permanent post of Surveyor-General. In 1861, he retired as Surveyor-General and moved back to England. There, he served as a lieutenant-colonel and a major-general in the Royal Engineers before retiring. In 1871, he became the 5th Baronet of Ford and Hutchings, Sussex.

In 1860, the Victorian government botanist, Ferdinand von Mueller named a newly discovered flowering plant Eremophila freelingii in his honour. The type specimen of the species had been collected by George Charles Hawker on Freeling's expedition to Lake Torrens in South Australia.

== Death ==
Freeling died in England on 26 March 1885. His son Harry succeeded him as the 6th Baronet of Ford and Hutchings, Sussex.

Political offices
New title	Commissioner of Public Works; 24 Oct 1856 – 20 Mar 1857	Succeeded by Samuel Davenport
Civic offices
Preceded by Edward Charles Frome	Surveyor General of South Australia; 1849–1861	Succeeded by George Woodroffe Goyder
Baronetage of the United Kingdom
Preceded by Henry Hill Freeling	Baronet (of the General Post Office and of Ford and Hutchings); 1820–1885	Succeeded by Harry Freeling
