= The Hoo, Hampstead =

The Hoo
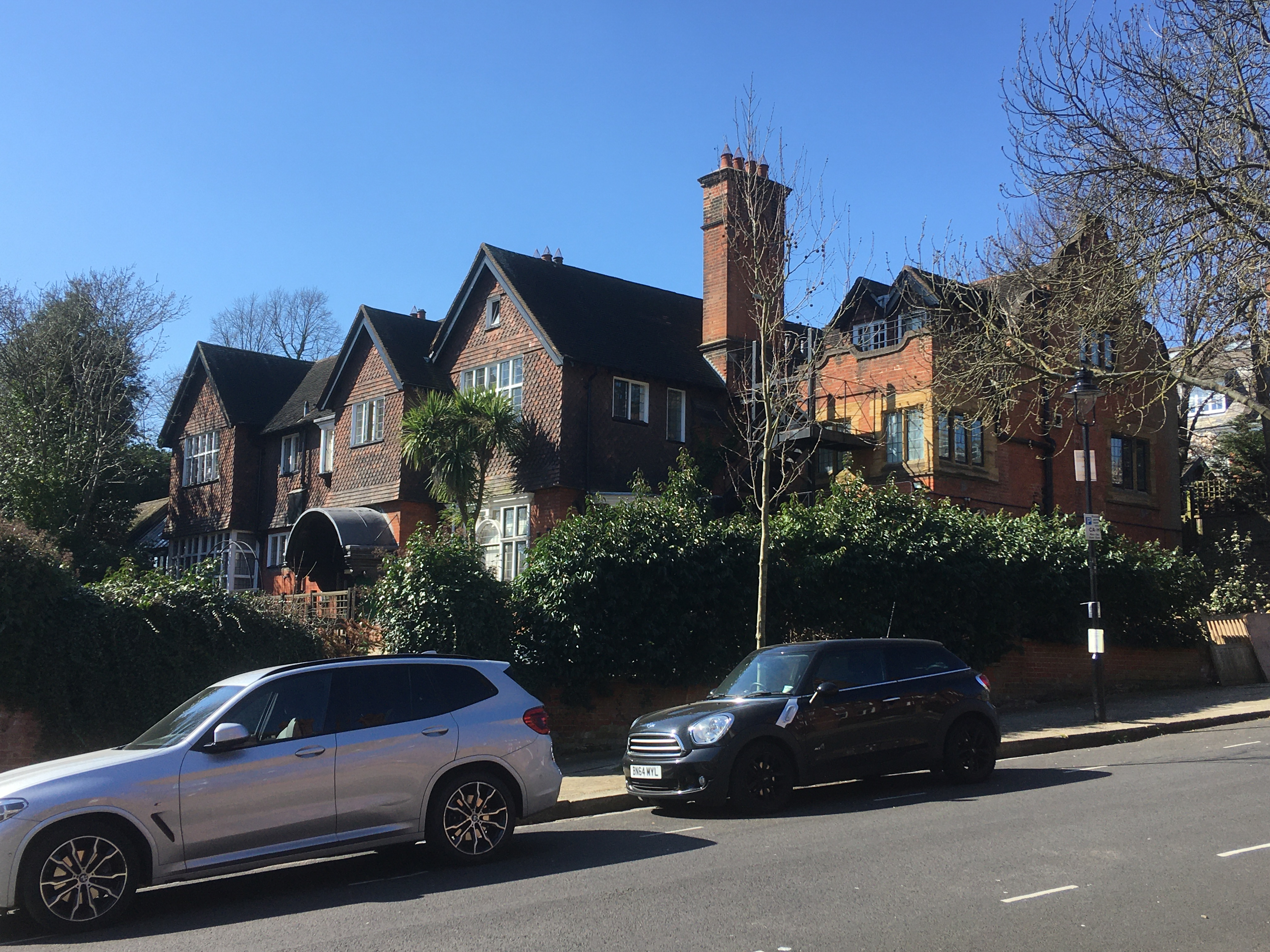
- The Hoo, 17 Lyndhurst Gardens, London, NW3 designed by Horace Field

- Location within Greater London
- 51°33′7.62″N 0°10′19.47″W
- Location: 17 Lyndhurst Gardens, Hampstead, London, NW3

History
- Built: 1888-90

Site notes
- Architect: Horace Field
- Architectural style: Queen Anne style

Listed Building – Grade II
- Official name: 17 Lyndhurst Gardens
- Designated: 11 January 1998
- Reference no.: 1113327

The Hoo is a large detached house in the Hampstead area of the London Borough of Camden. An early design in the Queen Anne style by the architect Horace Field, it was built 1888–90 and altered 1987–88. It is a Grade II listed building.

The English Heritage listing describes its style as an "Irregular composition in Domestic Revival style, much influenced by Norman Shaw". The house faces south at a right angle to Lyndhurst Gardens. The eastern flank of the house has a tall chimney and a broad gable. The house is built of red brick, with tile-hanging features on the upper storey. The casement windows are built partly of stone and timber, with leaded lights. The tiled roofs have overhanging eaves. The interior retains many original features, with original panelling, plasterwork, door surrounds and fireplaces. The original staircase has been retained, along with dados, and a built-in window seat with chests of drawers.

Field later designed several houses in nearby Lyndhurst Road, this time in a Neo-Georgian style.

The house was occupied by the Belsize, Gospel Oak and West Hampstead Community Health Teams, part of the Royal Free London NHS Foundation Trust. It is also the site of the archives of the Royal Free Hospital. Fleet Counselling, who offer one-on-one counselling services were also based in the building.

In 2019 the building was sold by Savills on behalf of the Royal Free NHS Foundation Trust, having failed to sell at auction on 26 November the previous year. A planning and listed building application for conversion to three houses is now being considered by the London Borough of Camden

== See also ==
- Healthcare in London
