= Bedford Lemere =

Bedford Lemere & Co was a firm of British architectural photographers active in the late nineteenth and early twentieth century. It was founded by Bedford Lemere (1839–1911) in 1861, with his son Henry (Harry) Bedford Lemere (1865–1944) joining the firm in 1881.

== History ==
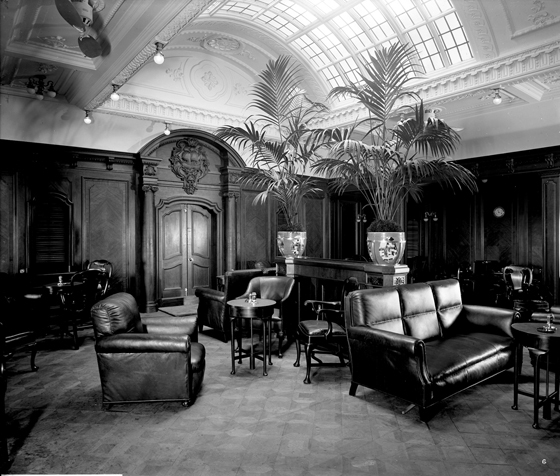
First class smoking room in the RMS Orama, 1911

The company was established by Bedford Lemere (1839–1911) in 1861, with its studio at 147 Strand, London from 1867 to 1947. His son Henry (also known as Harry) Bedford Lemere (1865–1944) joined the firm in 1881 and was one of the best known photographers, and the principal person behind the firm in its heyday.

Bedford Lemere & Co. was the leading English firm of architectural photographers between 1870 and 1930, and pioneered the photography of new buildings. Their images captured the use of new technologies such as the motor car, electric light and motion pictures and the introduction of the steel frame and reinforced concrete which revolutionised architecture.

Bedford Lemere & Co's client list was wide-ranging; they worked for anyone that needed architectural photography: property companies, estate agents, decorators, businesses needing photographs of their premises or house-owners who wanted photographs of their homes. Bedford Lemere & Co photographed buildings by notable architects; John Norton, Matthew Digby Wyatt, Ernest George, Harold Peto, Arthur Blomfield, Alfred Waterhouse and Edward Blakeway I'Anson who designed Winterfold House in Surrey.

The firm was also particularly well known for photographs of ocean liner interiors, customers including CP Ships, Cunard, Orient Lines, P&O, Union-Castle Line and White Star Line; many of these are now in the collection of the National Maritime Museum in London.

The firm also had premises in Manchester between 1875 and 1877, and kept a strong presence in the North West and Scotland for 40 years. This included working with Gillow's of Lancaster and S J Waring & Sons of Liverpool, and the subsequent Waring & Gillow firm of furnishers and decorators, established in 1897 following their merger. Bedford Lemere went on to photograph the Waring & Gillow's munitions factories during the First World War. Bedford Lemere received the Hood medal from the Royal Photographic Society in 1941. After closing the studio at 147 Strand in 1947, the firm moved to 3 Park Lane, Croydon. It was acquired by Archie Handford Ltd in 1967.

== Henry (Harry) Bedford Lemere ==
The photographer Henry (Harry) Bedford Lemere was born on the 8 August 1865 at 26 Chalcot Crescent, Primrose Hill, London to the commercial traveller Bedford Lemere and Harriett Anne, née Pennyfeather. He was educated at the City of London School. He died in 1944.

== Works ==
The majority of Bedford Lemere & Co's surviving photographs are in the Bedford Lemere Collection, held by Historic England in its public archive in Swindon. The collection contains over a quarter of the firm's output, estimated at 100,000 images and is by far the most important surviving collection of its work. This includes 21,800 large-format glass negatives, and around 3,000 prints. The collection also includes some albums and day books, which give a unique insight into the company's activities. It is regarded as an "important source of images of English architecture and life from 1870 until the Second World War".

Over 24,000 images can be seen online, free of charge. Small caches of Bedford Lemere & Co's photographs are held elsewhere including at the Royal Institute of British Architects, the V&A, the National Maritime Museum and the Royal Commission on the Ancient and Historical Monuments of Scotland.

The Conway Photographic Library at The Courtauld Institute of Art contains photographs bearing the Bedford Lemere makers stamp. These are being digitised along with the rest of the collection.

== Publications ==
- Cooper, Nicholas, The Opulent Eye: Late Victorian and Edwardian Taste in Interior Design, The Architectural Press Ltd, 1977, ISBN 0-8230-7402-1
- Cooper, Nicholas, The Photography of Bedford Lemere & Co, Liverpool University Press, 2011, ISBN 978-1-84802-061-0

== External ==
- Results - Historic England Archives Over 24,000 Bedford Lemere & Co images online from Historic England
- Search: English Heritage Bedford Lemere Other Beford Lemere & Co images
- Review: The Photography of Bedford Lemere & Co
