= Horace Field =

British architect

- Born: 17 July 1861; 22 Chalcot Crescent, Primrose Hill, London
- Died: 16 June 1948 (aged 86); Royal East County Hospital, Hastings, Sussex
- Resting place: St Michael's, Playden, Sussex
- Education: University College School, Hampstead
- Occupation: Architect
- Spouse: Mary Frances Campbell

Horace Field (17 July 1861 – 16 June 1948) was a London-born architect. His work was often in a Wrenaissance style, as well as other post-gothic English historical revival styles, with influences from the Arts and Crafts movement and Richard Norman Shaw. His commissions including large houses and offices; he produced a number of works for Lloyds Bank as well as offices for the North Eastern Railway in London and York.

== Early life ==
Horace Field was born 17 July 1861 at 22 Chalcot Crescent, London; the son of Horace Field (architect, District Surveyor of Putney and Roehampton, 1823–1879) and his wife Christina née White (d. 1866). He was brought up at 30 Thurlow Road, Hampstead and was educated at University College School (1876–8).

== Career ==
He trained as an architect at the Glasgow firm of John Burnet, then under Robert William Edis of London. Field was not inspired by Edis's work, but developed great admiration and respect for Richard Norman Shaw, architect and neighbour in Hampstead, who he knew socially – both for his work and as an example of humanity.

Field started his own practice in 1882, as Field and Moore, together with his father's assistant Edwin Emmanuel Moore; their first work was Wedderburn House (1884–5), a six-storey block of flats in Hampstead; Wedderburn Cottage (1886) followed adjacent.

In 1887 he married Mary Frances Campbell, daughter of James Campbell at St James Episcopal Church, Leith. He joined the Art Workers Guild in 1889. "The Hoo" (17, Lyndhurst Gardens) in Camden was built 1890, and further properties at Nos. 19–21 Lyndhurst Road in 1898.

In 1890 Field took on Michael Bunney as a trainee; Bunney became Field's chief assistant, until 1902, when he formed his own practice. Together they wrote English domestic architecture of the XVII and XVIII centuries. Field's first commercial business client was Lloyds Bank who commissioned bank buildings at Hampstead c.1895; subsequently Lloyds used Field as architect over a 30-year period.

In 1898 the North Eastern Railway (NER) chose Field as architect for their new main headquarters in York, now the Grand hotel. Working with William Bell the company's architect, whose input was mainly structural or contractual, the office buildings were constructed between 1900 and 1906, with Field receiving £1,750 payment for his work. Field also received the commission to design the NER's London offices at 4 Cowley Street, Westminster, his plans were submitted 1904 and the building completed 1906.

In 1899 Evelyn Simmons joined the practice, initially being articled, then assistant and finally in partnership from 1905 to 1915. Simmons family connections brought work in Hampstead Garden Suburb and co-operation with Amos Faulkner, Simmons's brother-in-law and son of Charles Joseph Faulkner. Amos was architect for the builders William Willett and Son, for whom the practice produced designs for several large London houses, and apartments.

Mary Field's friendship with Elizabeth Garrett Anderson and her circle of friends led to him becoming the consulting architect to the New Hospital for Women on Euston Road from 1888 to 1905, where he designed a nurses home (now demolished) at the rear of the building.

Field left the Art Workers' Guild in 1903 and joined RIBA in 1906.

He was a keen golfer, which led to many commissions for "golf cottages" (the term then used for houses close to golf courses) near Woking, Surrey and Aldeburgh, Suffolk, where he also designed the Aldeburgh Golf Club house in 1911, a replacement for an earlier building by J. M. Brydon destroyed by fire.

== Later life ==
He continued in practice until 1931, retiring to Rye in 1932, where he undertook a few commissions for small house designs and alterations. His last built design was in 1941, as a favour for his cousin Daisy Field, at Great Dixter, for a conversion of a store attached to the oasthouse into a cow house.

He died on 16 June 1948 and is buried with his wife Mary Frances (1859–1950) in the churchyard at St Michael's Playden, Sussex.

== Selected works ==
Fields' work has been described as being in the wrenaissance style; his exteriors included a variety of historical revival styles, such as Queen Anne revival and neo-Georgian. Most works were done in red brick, often with stone dressing. He often made use of steeply pitched roofs with dormer windows to contain extra stories.

A list of works by Horace Field on the Historic England Register of Listed Buildings

- Wedderburn House, 1 Wedderburn Road, Hampstead (1884–5).
- "Wedderburn Cottage" 3, Wedderburn Road, Hampstead (1886).
- 5, Wedderburn Road, Hampstead (1886).
- 7 & 9, Wedderburn Road, Hampstead (1887).
- 11 & 13, Wedderburn Road, Hampstead (1888).
- "The Hoo"; 17, Lyndhurst Gardens (1889–90).
- Christian Science Reading Room, 2a Prince Arthur Road, Hampstead (1891)
- 11, 12 & 13 Gainsborough Gardens, Camden (1893–5).
- 14, Gainsborough Gardens, Hampstead (1894–5).
- Lloyds Bank, 40 & 40A, Rosslyn Hill, with adjoining terraced houses, Hampstead (1895–7).
- 19, 20 & 21 Lyndhurst Road, Hampstead (1897–8).
- Granville Hotel, Ramsgate, Kent (1900) Alterations.
- North Eastern Railway company offices, York (1900–1906).
- 5. St.Clements Ln., 6 & 7, Portugal Street, City of Westminster (1903).
- Lloyds Bank, 36 High Street, Wealdstone, Harrow, Middlesex (1903).
- 4 Cowley Street, City of Westminster, (1904–5). London offices for the North Eastern Railway.
- Lloyds Bank, West Street, Okehampton, Devon (1908)
- 8, Barton Street, City of Westminster (1909).
- 12A and 14–18 Devonshire Street, Marylebone (1912) with Simmonds and Faulkner.
- 7 Palace Green, Kensington (1913) with Simmons and Faulkner.
- Priors Hill, 48 Park Road, Aldeburgh, Suffolk (before 1914).
- Gorsehill, Leiston Road, Aldeburgh, Suffolk (1928).

Publications

- Field, Horace; Bunney, Michael (1905), English domestic architecture of the XVII and XVIII centuries : a selection of examples of smaller buildings measured drawn and photographed with an introduction and notes, George Bell and Sons
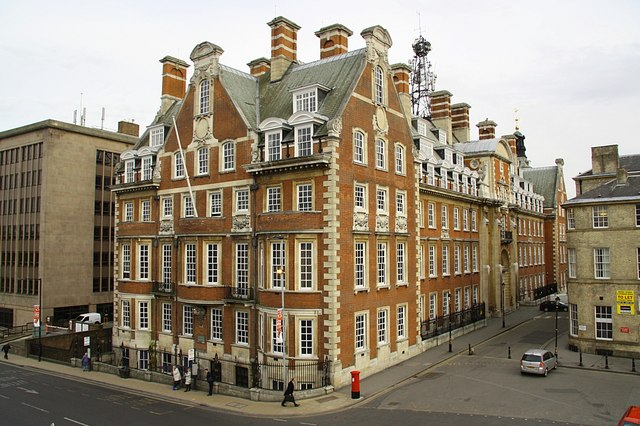
former NER company offices, York. West elevation (2009)

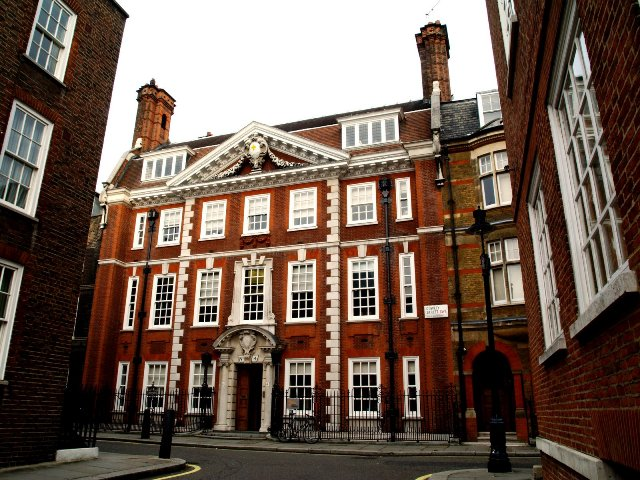
former NER London offices, Cowley St. (2007)

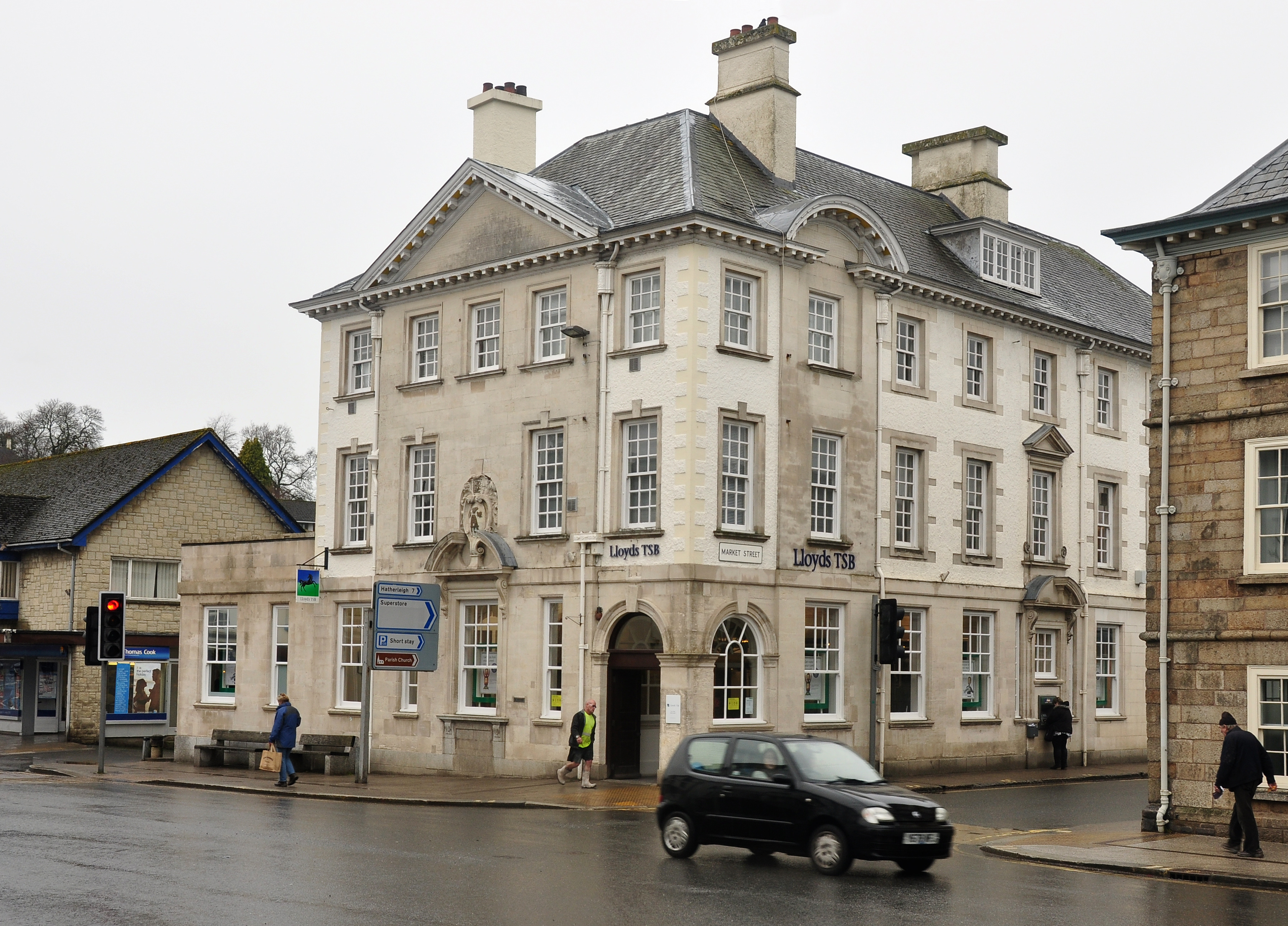
Lloyds Bank, Okehampton, Devon (2011)

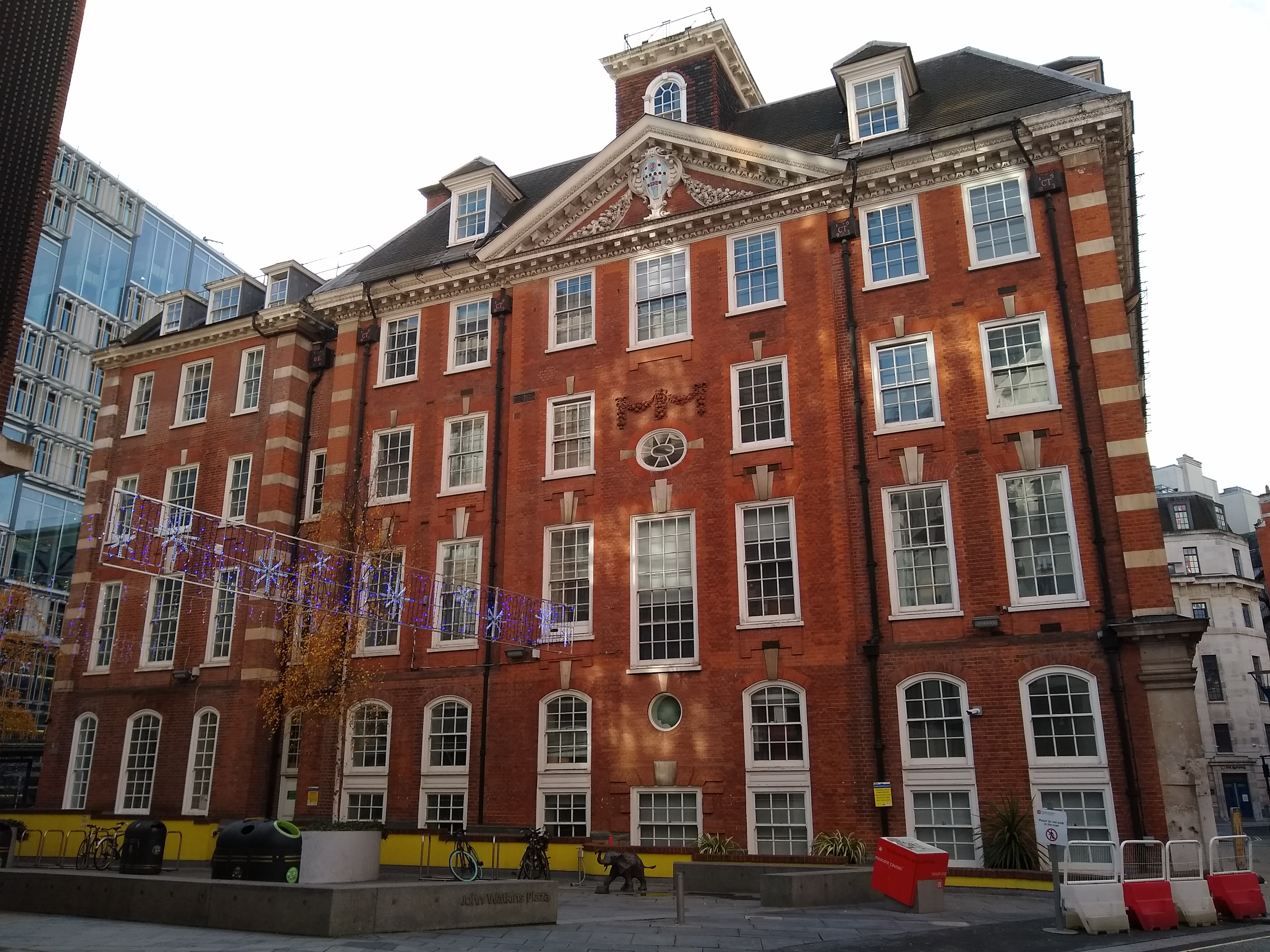
6&7 Portugal Street and 5 St Clements Lane, City of Westminster, (1903)

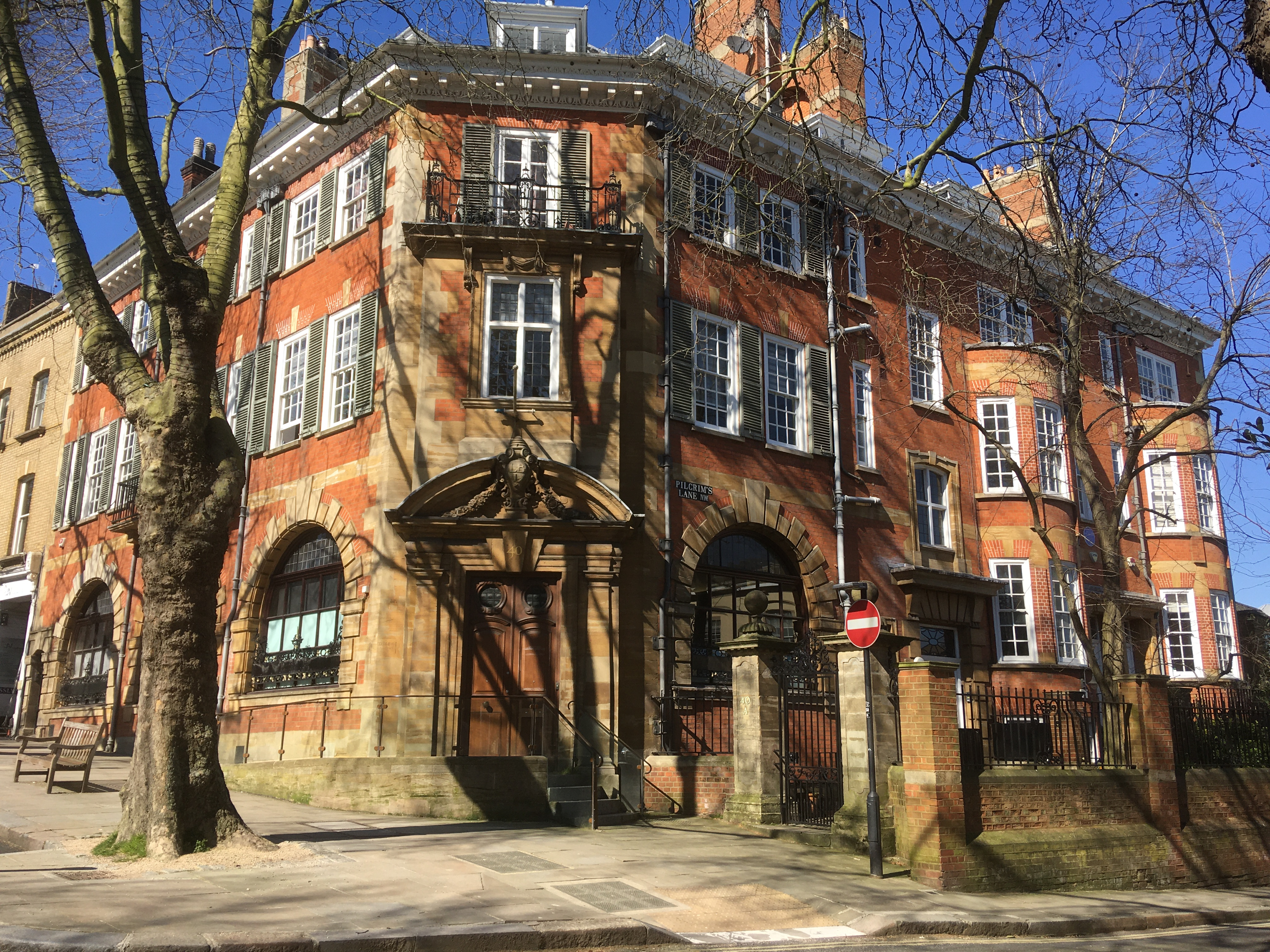
Former Lloyds Bank, 40&40a Rosslyn Hill, Hampstead (1895-7)

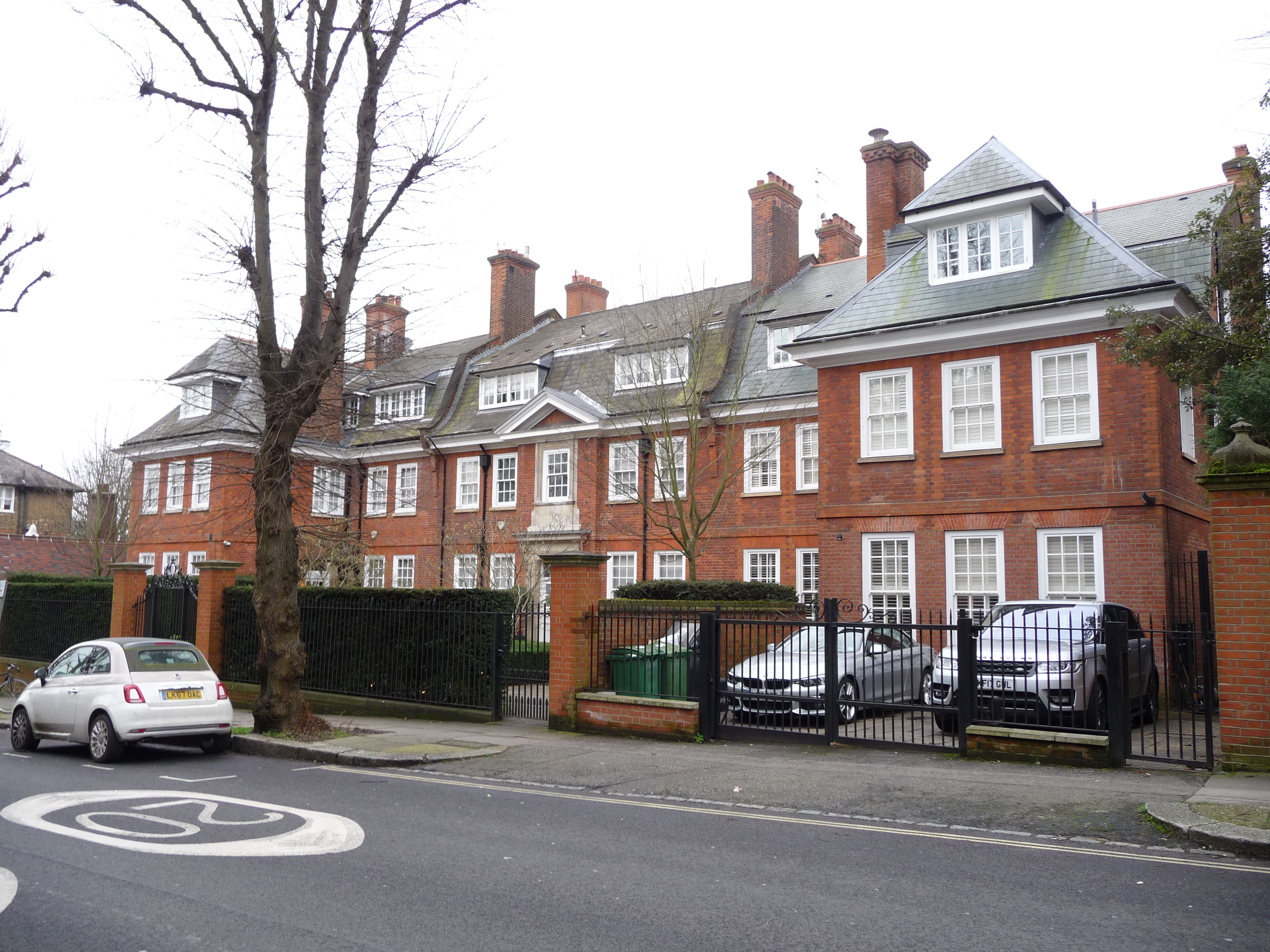
19-21 Lyndhurst Road, Hampstead (1897-8)
