= Rosslyn House =

Historic building in London

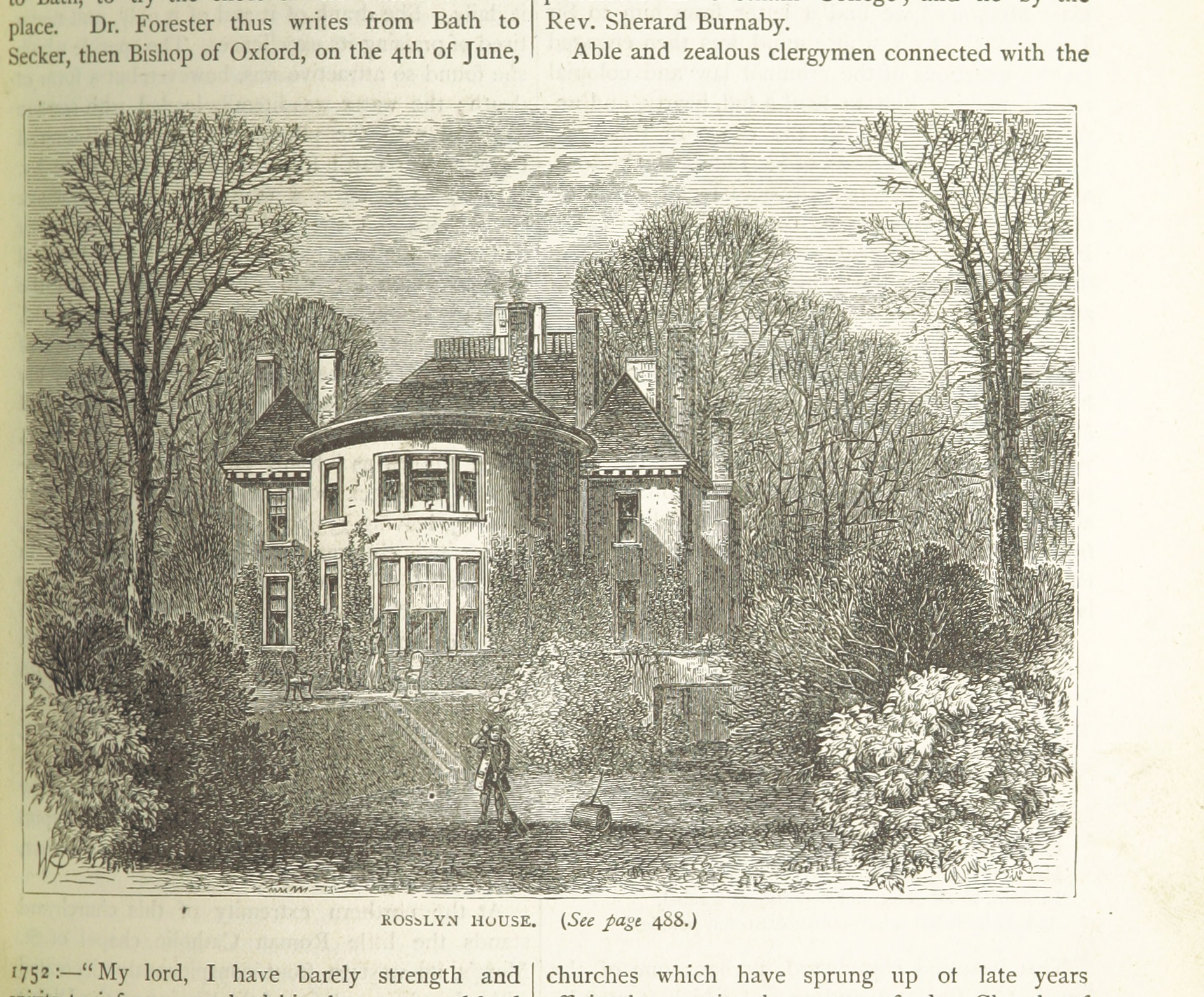
Rosslyn House.

Rosslyn House was a historic residence in what is now the Belsize Park area of London. Dating back to the sixteenth century and then known as Grove House, it was acquired in 1794 by the Scottish judge Alexander Wedderburn, 1st Earl of Rosslyn, the Lord Chancellor. Around this time the house occupied an estate of around twenty one acres. After his death, the property was named after the Earl by subsequent occupant Robert Milligan. He was known for his role in the construction of the West India Docks.

Queen Victoria at one point considered the house as a possible nursery for the Royal family. The previously rural area began to change in the mid-nineteenth century when nearby Belsize House and its grounds were developed to provide housing for the expanding capital. The Rosslyn House estate also began to be sold off in parcels for new streets and related residential development.

In 1896 the house was demolished for replacement by multiple units of housing. The street names of the redeveloped area commemorate Rosslyn and other Lord Chancellors of the late Georgian era: Eldon, Lyndhurst and Thurlow. Lyndhurst Road follows the route of the old Rosslyn Grove approach to Rosslyn House.

== Bibliography ==
- Cherry, Bridget & Pevsner, Nikolaus. London 4: North. Yale University Press, 2002.
- Wade, Christopher. The Streets of Belsize. Camden History Society, 1991.
