= Belsize House =

Historic property in London

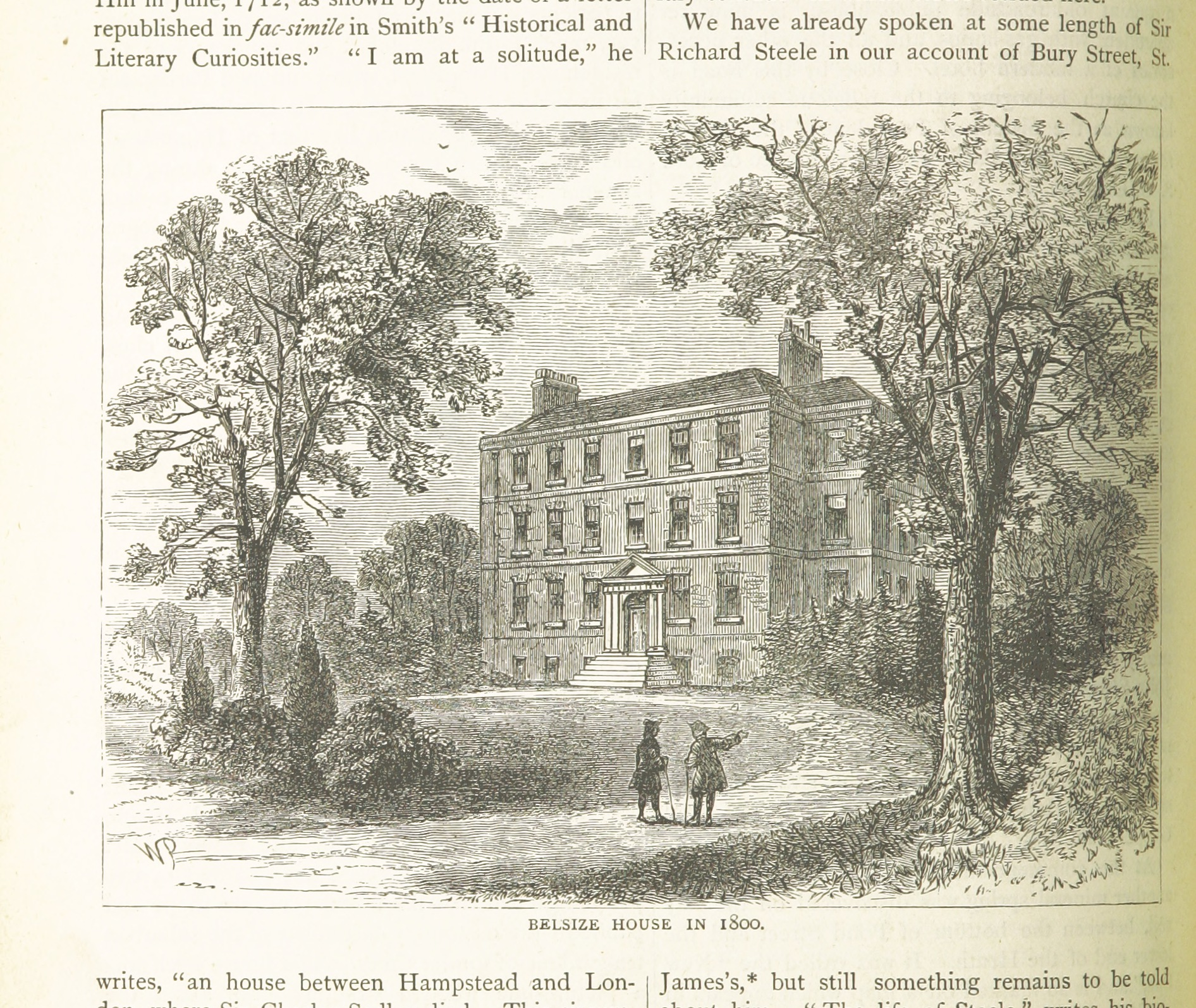
- Interactive map of the Belsize House area

General information
- Location: London Borough of Camden, England
- Coordinates: 51°32′49″N 0°10′08″W
- Year built: c. 1663
- Demolished: 1853

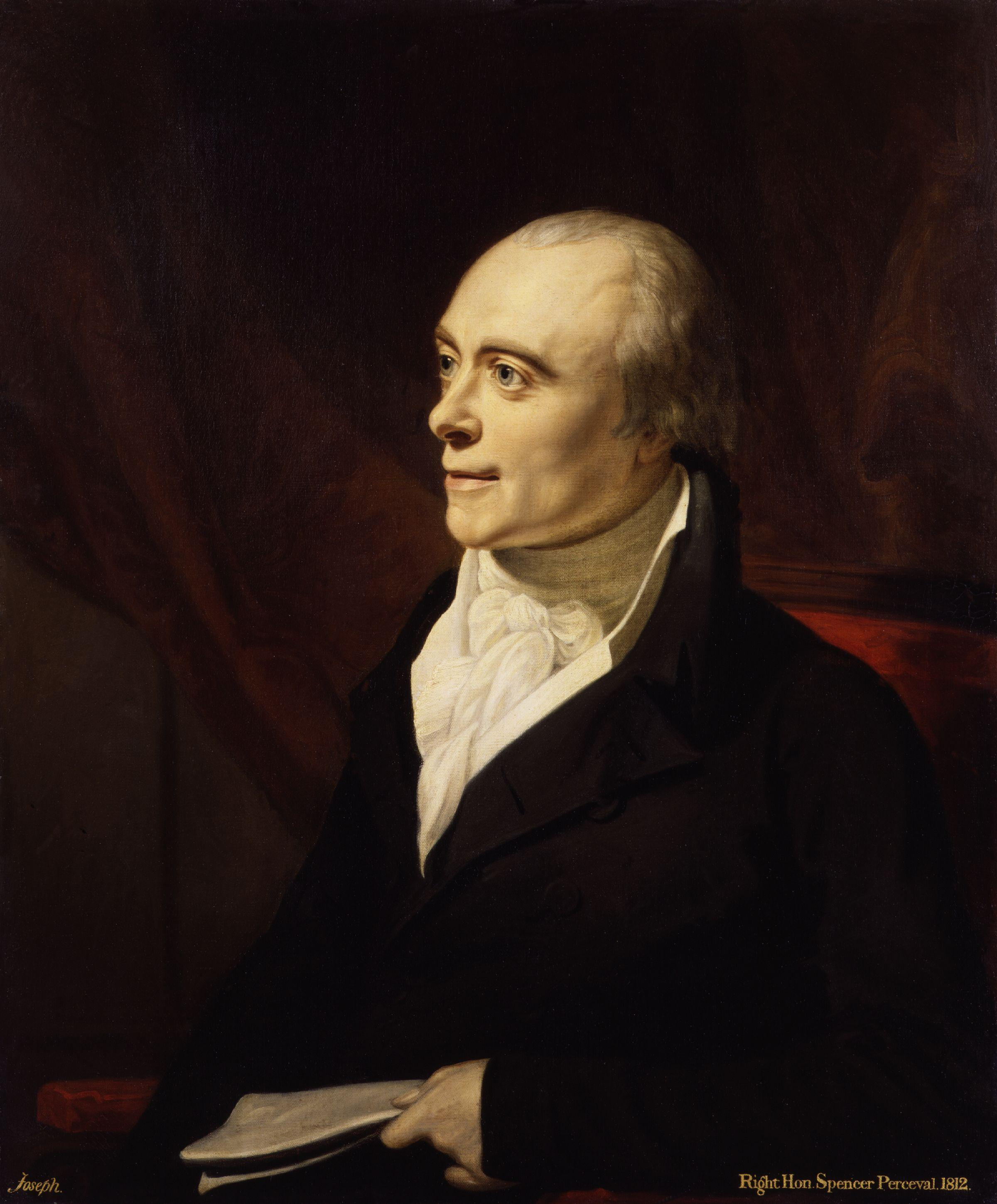
Future Prime Minister Spencer Perceval was amongst the house's residents, living there between 1798 and 1807.

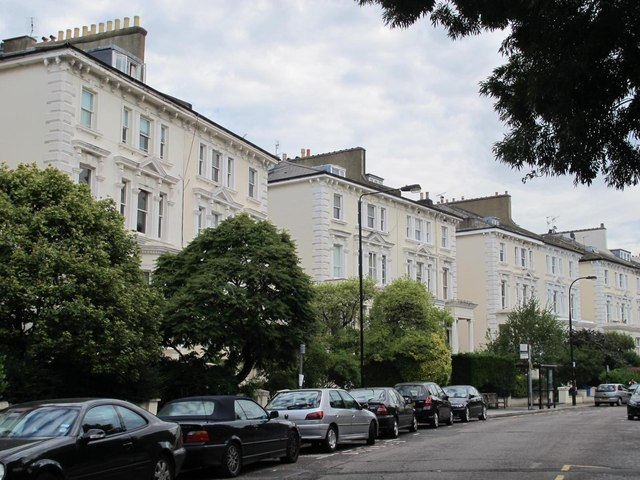
After Belsize House was demolished its estate was redeveloped into streets of Victorian housing.

Belsize House was a historic residence in Belsize Park in what is today the London Borough of Camden. It was a country estate located south of Hampstead, which was then some distance away from the outskirts of the capital.

== History ==
An Elizabethan manor house stood on the site. Daniel O'Neill, an Irish Cavalier in the English Civil Wars, was granted Belsize House by Charles II following the Restoration in 1660. O'Neill rebuilt the house in 1663 and it again underwent significant further remodelling from 1744 to 1746.

After 1720, Belsize became a place of public entertainment to cater to the growing traffic heading towards the fashionable Hampstead Wells. This included serving refreshments as well as turning the grounds into pleasure gardens. It soon gained a reputation for hosting gambling as well.

It subsequently reverted to being a residence. The politician Spencer Perceval rented the house between 1798 and 1807. He later served as Prime Minister before his assassination in 1812.

The house was demolished in 1853. The estate was redeveloped as a series of streets lined with white stucco townhouses to provide upmarket housing for the expanding population of the city. These included Belsize Park Gardens, while Belsize Lane, a little to the north, is an older road. The old house stood close to what is now St Peter's Church on Belsize Square and faced eastwards. What was once the former elm-lined approach to the house is now Belsize Avenue, which heads east to Haverstock Hill.

== See also ==
- Rosslyn House, a nearby property

== Bibliography ==
- Cherry, Bridget & Pevsner, Nikolaus. London 4: North. Yale University Press, 2002.
- Linklater, Andro. Why Spencer Perceval Had to Die: The Assassination of a British Prime Minister. A&C Black, 2013.
- Wade, Christopher. The Streets of Belsize. Camden History Society, 1991.
- Wroth, Warwick William & Wroth, Arthur Edgar. The London Pleasure Gardens of the Eighteenth Century. Macmillan and Company, 1896
