= Francis Freeling =

British official (1764–1836)

Sir Francis Freeling FSA
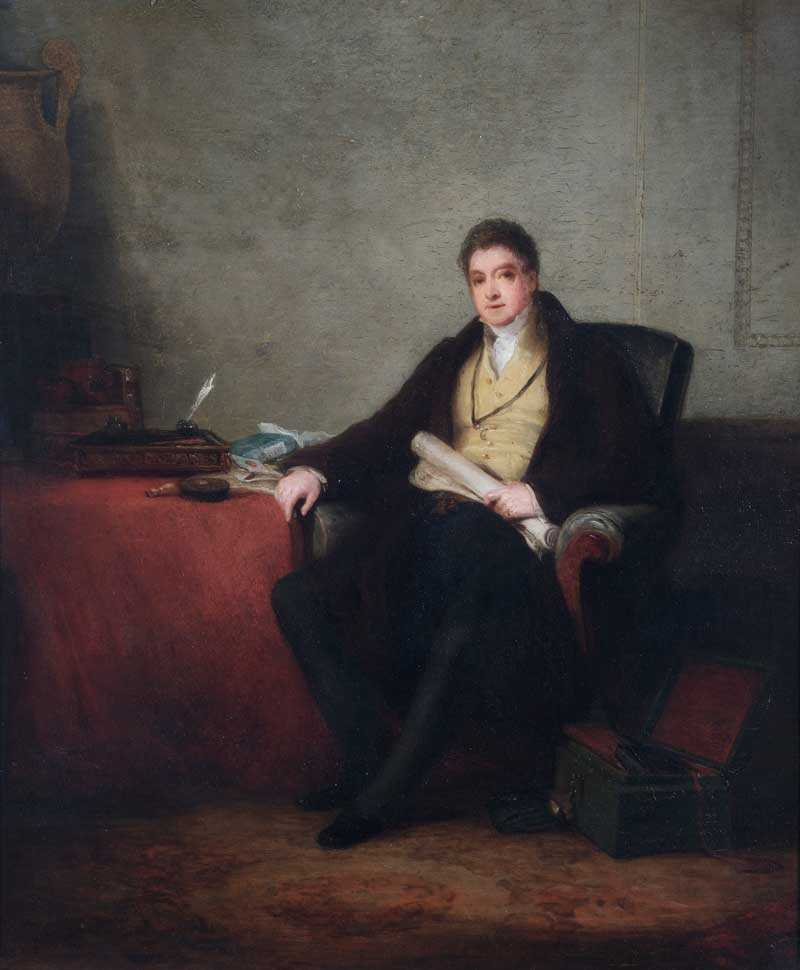
- Painted by George Jones

Secretary of the General Post Office
- In office 7 June 1798 – 10 July 1836

Personal details
- Born: 25 August 1764 Bristol
- Died: 10 July 1836 (aged 71)

Sir Francis Freeling, 1st Baronet FSA (25 August 1764 – 10 July 1836), was Secretary of the General Post Office.

He was born in Bristol, on 25 August 1764.

== Career ==
Freeling started work in the Bristol Post Office. In 1785 he was promoted, to a post in London, to develop the service. In 1797, he rose to the office of joint Secretary to the Post Office and in 1798, sole Secretary.

He initiated many reforms to the Post Office, including the introduction of local penny posts in large towns, the reorganization of London's postal service and the use of steam trains and steamships to replace horse-drawn vehicles and wind-powered ships.

On 11 March 1828, a baronetcy was conferred upon him, of the General Post Office in the City of London and of Ford and Hutchings in the County of Sussex, for his public service.

== Personal life ==
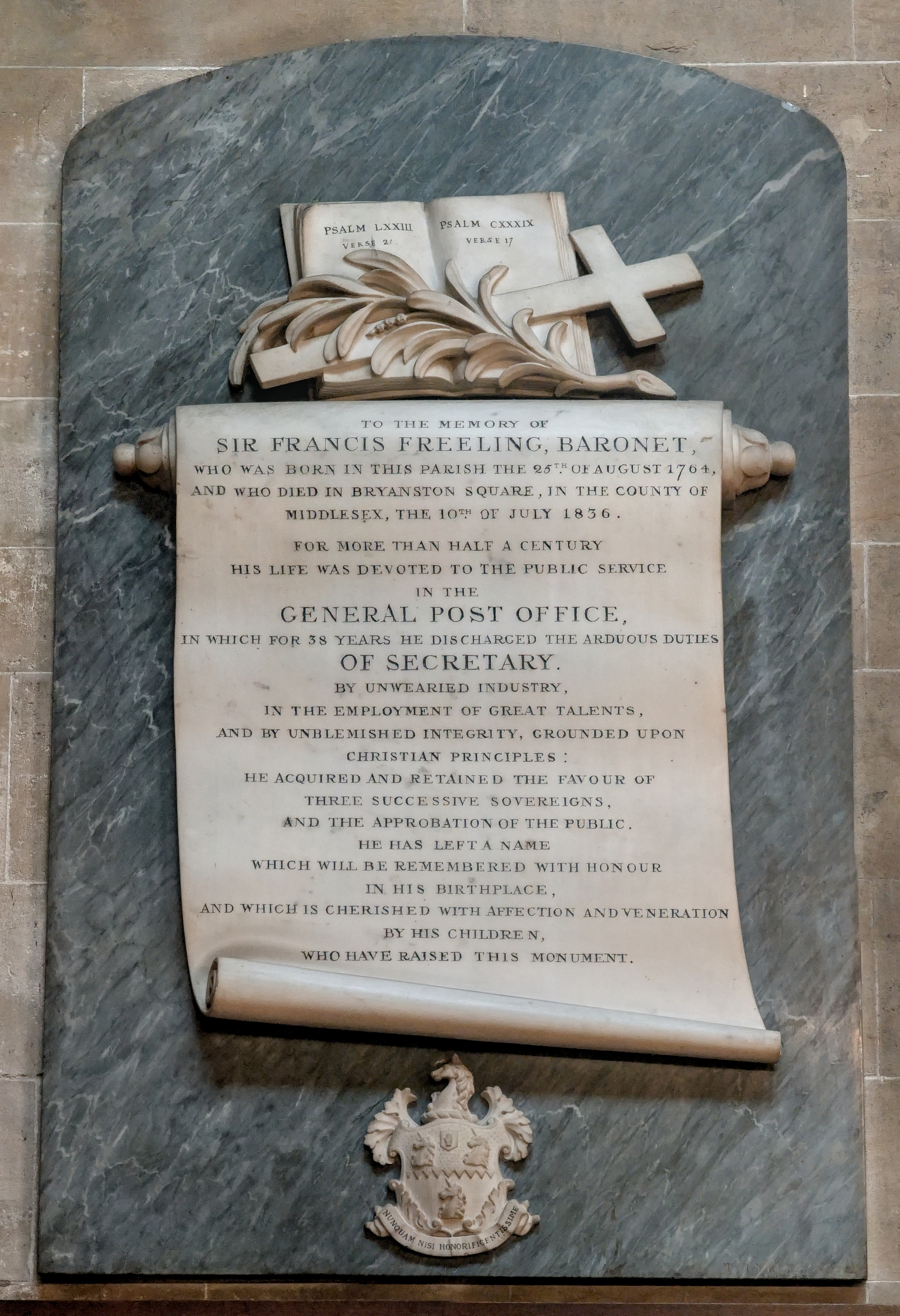
Monument to Sir Francis Freeling in St Mary Redcliffe Church

Freeling collected a large library. He was elected a fellow of the Society of Antiquaries of London in 1801, and was one of the original members of the Roxburghe Club, founded in 1812. In about 1814, he was living at Rosslyn House, Hampstead; and in later years he lived in Bryanston Square, where he died in 1836.

Freeling was married three times and had many children. On his death on 10 July 1836, he was succeeded in the baronetcy by his eldest surviving son, Sir George Henry Freeling (22 September 1789 – 30 November 1841). The eldest daughter, Charlotte, married James Heywood Markland.

Freeling House, the home of the British Postal Museum at Mount Pleasant, was named after him before the site was moved and reopened in 2017.

Baronetage of the United Kingdom
New creation	Baronet (of the General Post Office and of Ford and Hutchings); 1828–1836	Succeeded by George Freeling
