= Grade II* listed buildings in the City of Westminster (1–9) =

There are over 20,000 Grade II* listed buildings in England. This page is a list of these buildings in the City of Westminster.

== Buildings ==
Name	Location	Type	Completed (Note: The date given is the date used by Historic England as significant for the initial building or that of an important part in the structure's description.)	Date designated	Grid ref. (Note: The grid reference is based on the British national grid reference system, sometimes known as OSGB36, used by the Ordnance Survey.) Geo-coordinates	Entry number (Note: The "List Entry Number" is a unique number assigned to each listed building and scheduled monument by Historic England.)	Image
37 Harley Street	Marylebone	Apartment	1899	14 January 1970	TQ2867781548; 51°31′06″N 0°08′49″W	1066670	37 Harley Street More images
69 and 71 Harley Street	Marylebone	Terraced House	c1773-4	14 March 1966	TQ2862681702; 51°31′11″N 0°08′51″W	1066673	69 and 71 Harley Street
75 Harley Street	Marylebone	Terraced House	1773-4	10 September 1954	TQ2862081718; 51°31′11″N 0°08′51″W	1357104	75 Harley Street
77 Harley Street	Marylebone	Terraced House	c1774-80	10 September 1954	TQ2861881726; 51°31′11″N 0°08′51″W	1230076	77 Harley Street
78 Harley Street	Marylebone	Terraced House	c1773-75	14 March 1966	TQ2865081759; 51°31′12″N 0°08′50″W	1352690	78 Harley Street More images
83 and 85 Harley Street	Marylebone	Terraced House	c1774-6	10 September 1954	TQ2860781761; 51°31′12″N 0°08′52″W	1278761	83 and 85 Harley Street More images
88 Harley Street	Marylebone	Terraced House	c1774-6	10 September 1954	TQ2863181801; 51°31′14″N 0°08′51″W	1066661	88 Harley Street
106 Harley Street	Marylebone	Terraced House	c1776-7	10 September 1954	TQ2859881900; 51°31′17″N 0°08′52″W	1229954	106 Harley Street More images
107 and 109 Harley Street	Marylebone	Terraced House	c1777	10 September 1954	TQ2857081884; 51°31′16″N 0°08′54″W	1230130	107 and 109 Harley Street More images
115 Harley Street	Marylebone	Terraced House	c. 1777	10 September 1954	TQ2856181912; 51°31′17″N 0°08′54″W	1278749	115 Harley Street More images
121 Harley Street	Marylebone	Terraced House	c. 1780	14 January 1970	TQ2854881952; 51°31′19″N 0°08′55″W	1066677	121 Harley Street
59 and 61 Riding House Street	Fitzrovia	Apartment	1903	5 February 1970	TQ2919381683; 51°31′09″N 0°08′22″W	1235222	59 and 61 Riding House Street More images
1 and 2 Robert Street	City of Westminster	Apartment	1768–1774	24 February 1958	TQ3036780555; 51°30′32″N 0°07′22″W	1235244	1 and 2 Robert Street More images
5 Suffolk Street	City of Westminster	Terraced House	c. 1826	5 February 1970	TQ2983480499; 51°30′31″N 0°07′50″W	1237160	5 Suffolk Street
6 Suffolk Street	City of Westminster	Terraced House	1823-4	5 February 1970	TQ2983280505; 51°30′31″N 0°07′50″W	1264250	6 Suffolk Street
6½ and 7 Suffolk Street	City of Westminster	Art Gallery	c. 1823	5 February 1970	TQ2982380508; 51°30′31″N 0°07′51″W	1237161	6½ and 7 Suffolk Street More images
8, 9, and 11 Suffolk Street	City of Westminster	Terraced House	c1822-3	5 February 1970	TQ2981580525; 51°30′32″N 0°07′51″W	1237162	8, 9, and 11 Suffolk Street
12–14 Suffolk Street	City of Westminster	Terraced House	1822-3	5 February 1970	TQ2981180535; 51°30′32″N 0°07′51″W	1264251	12–14 Suffolk Street More images
20–22 Suffolk Street	City of Westminster	Terraced House	c1822-3	24 February 1958	TQ2980580493; 51°30′30″N 0°07′52″W	1237164	20–22 Suffolk Street
84 Margaret Street	City of Westminster	Church House	1868–1870	2 October 1969	TQ2927581433; 51°31′01″N 0°08′18″W	1273611	84 Margaret Street More images
43 Parliament Street	Whitehall	Terraced House	c. 1753	5 February 1970	TQ3018579736; 51°30′06″N 0°07′33″W	1265867	43 Parliament Street
44 Parliament Street	Whitehall	Terraced House	c. 1753	5 February 1970	TQ3018679744; 51°30′06″N 0°07′33″W	1226435	44 Parliament Street
47 Parliament Street	Whitehall	Clubhouse	1864-6	5 February 1970	TQ3018779771; 51°30′07″N 0°07′33″W	1265868	47 Parliament Street More images
161 Piccadilly and 49 St James's Street	Whitehall	Commercial Office	1907	30 May 1972	TQ2913380372; 51°30′27″N 0°08′27″W	1226578	161 Piccadilly and 49 St James's Street More images
3 St James's Street	City of Westminster	Terraced House	c1731-2	24 February 1958	TQ2932280156; 51°30′20″N 0°08′17″W	1264868	3 St James's Street More images
87 and 88 St James’s Street	City of Westminster	Commercial Office	1903–1904	5 February 1970	TQ2930580109; 51°30′18″N 0°08′18″W	1235898	87 and 88 St James’s Street More images
1 and 2 St James’s Street and 64 and 64A Pall Mall	City of Westminster	Commercial Office	1882	24 February 1958	TQ2933080144; 51°30′20″N 0°08′17″W	1264867	1 and 2 St James’s Street and 64 and 64A Pall Mall More images
4 St James's Place	City of Westminster	Terraced House	c. 1685	20 May 1969	TQ2921980196; 51°30′21″N 0°08′22″W	1264975	4 St James's Place More images
26 St James's Place	City of Westminster	Flats	1959–1960	22 December 1998	TQ2914380133; 51°30′19″N 0°08′26″W	1246689	26 St James's Place More images
74 St James Street	City of Westminster	Gentlemen's Club	1843-5	6 May 1969	TQ2928180151; 51°30′20″N 0°08′19″W	1271896	74 St James Street More images
10 and 12 Palace Court	Palace Court, Bayswater, W2	House	1890	25 September 1951	TQ2561980607; 51°30′38″N 0°11′28″W	1065877	10 and 12 Palace Court More images
67 and 68 Dean Street	City of Westminster	House	1732	24 February 1958	TQ2968581030; 51°30′48″N 0°07′57″W	1066916	67 and 68 Dean Street More images
76 Dean Street	Dean Street, Soho, W1	Terraced House	1732–33	24 February 1958	TQ2965081097; 51°30′50″N 0°07′59″W	1066917	76 Dean Street
78 Dean Street	City of Westminster	House	1732	9 January 1970	TQ2964281115; 51°30′51″N 0°07′59″W	1066918	78 Dean Street More images
88 Dean Street	Dean Street, Soho, W1	House	1791	1 December 1987	TQ2961681190; 51°30′53″N 0°08′00″W	1066920	88 Dean Street More images
1–8 Goodwin's Court	Covent Court, City of Westminster	House	Late 18th century	24 February 1958	TQ3011680774; 51°30′39″N 0°07′35″W	1066764	1–8 Goodwin's Court
18 Cavendish Square	City of Westminster	House	Mid 19th century	10 September 1954	TQ2872881368; 51°31′00″N 0°08′46″W	1066307	18 Cavendish Square More images
46 Grosvenor Street	Mayfair, City of Westminster	House	1910	1 December 1987	TQ2853180761; 51°30′40″N 0°08′57″W	1066700	46 Grosvenor Street More images
1 Cowley Street	City of Westminster	House	Rebuilt	24 February 1958	TQ3007579255; 51°29′50″N 0°07′39″W	1220724	1 Cowley Street
2 and 3 Cowley Street	City of Westminster	Terraced House	c. 1722	24 February 1958	TQ3008279255; 51°29′50″N 0°07′39″W	1066951	2 and 3 Cowley Street
13 Cowley Street	City of Westminster	Terraced House	c. 1722	24 February 1958	TQ3008979235; 51°29′50″N 0°07′38″W	1356975	13 Cowley Street
14 Cowley Street	City of Westminster	Terraced House	c. 1722	24 February 1958	TQ3008479235; 51°29′50″N 0°07′39″W	1220752	14 Cowley Street
15 Cowley Street	City of Westminster	Terraced House	c. 1722	24 February 1958	TQ3007879235; 51°29′50″N 0°07′39″W	1066952	15 Cowley Street
16 and 17 Cowley Street	City of Westminster	Terraced House	c. 1722	24 February 1958	TQ3007079236; 51°29′50″N 0°07′39″W	1220766	16 and 17 Cowley Street More images
18 Cowley Street	City of Westminster	Terraced House	c. 1722	24 February 1958	TQ3006179235; 51°29′50″N 0°07′40″W	1066953	18 Cowley Street More images
19 Cowley Street	City of Westminster	House	1920	24 February 1958	TQ3005079236; 51°29′50″N 0°07′40″W	1220778	19 Cowley Street More images
12 Victoria Square	Victoria, SW1	House	c. 1840	24 February 1958	TQ2883979285; 51°29′52″N 0°08′43″W	1357316	12 Victoria Square
Hazlitt's, 6 and 7 Frith Street	Soho	House	1909	24 February 1958	TQ2972881145; 51°30′52″N 0°07′55″W	1211966	Hazlitt's, 6 and 7 Frith Street More images
15 Frith Street	Soho	House	c. 1734	14 January 1970	TQ2975681087; 51°30′50″N 0°07′53″W	1357016	15 Frith Street
60 Frith Street	Soho	House	18th century	14 January 1970	TQ2970781130; 51°30′51″N 0°07′56″W	1289731	60 Frith Street
8 Clifford Street	Mayfair	House	1719	24 February 1958	TQ2902180756; 51°30′40″N 0°08′32″W	1066983	8 Clifford Street More images
47 Berkeley Square	Mayfair, City of Westminster	House	1750	9 January 1970	TQ2874680536; 51°30′33″N 0°08′46″W	1357190	47 Berkeley Square
22 Charles Street	Mayfair, City of Westminster	House	LATE 18th century OR EARLY 19th century	9 January 1970	TQ2856980354; 51°30′27″N 0°08′56″W	1217956	22 Charles Street More images
37 and 38 Charles Street	Charles Street, Mayfair	House	Mid 18th century	1 December 1987	TQ2870680392; 51°30′28″N 0°08′49″W	1357295	37 and 38 Charles Street More images
40 Charles Street	Mayfair, City of Westminster	Terraced House	c1750-1753	24 February 1958	TQ2873080415; 51°30′29″N 0°08′47″W	1066296	40 Charles Street
41 Charles Street	Mayfair, City of Westminster	Terraced House	c1750-1753	24 February 1958	TQ2874180422; 51°30′29″N 0°08′47″W	1217994	41 Charles Street
8–23 Eaton Square including 57 Lower Belgrave Street	City of Westminster	Terrace	c1825 onwards	24 February 1958	TQ2855979129; 51°29′47″N 0°08′58″W	1066852	8–23 Eaton Square including 57 Lower Belgrave Street More images
24–48 Eaton Square and 72 and 72A Elizabeth Street	City of Westminster	Terrace	c1825 onwards	24 February 1958	TQ2836778924; 51°29′41″N 0°09′08″W	1357004	24–48 Eaton Square and 72 and 72A Elizabeth Street More images
51–62 Eaton Square	City of Westminster	House	C20	24 February 1958	TQ2831678875; 51°29′39″N 0°09′11″W	1066853	51–62 Eaton Square More images
67–71 Eaton Square	City of Westminster	Terrace	Mid 19th century	24 February 1958	TQ2820278884; 51°29′40″N 0°09′17″W	1066855	67–71 Eaton Square
73–82 Eaton Square	City of Westminster	Terrace	1826–30	24 February 1958	TQ2821278969; 51°29′42″N 0°09′16″W	1211087	73–82 Eaton Square More images
83–102 Eaton Square	City of Westminster	Terrace	c1825 onwards	24 February 1958	TQ2837579135; 51°29′48″N 0°09′07″W	1356981	83–102 Eaton Square More images
103–118 Eaton Square	City of Westminster	Terrace	c1825 onwards	24 February 1958	TQ2846579238; 51°29′51″N 0°09′03″W	1066851	103–118 Eaton Square More images
229 Strand	City of Westminster	Jettied House	Early 17th century	24 February 1958	TQ3109181081; 51°30′48″N 0°06′44″W	1264444	229 Strand More images
2–10 Tavistock Street	City of Westminster	Office	1904-5	5 February 1970	TQ3043480823; 51°30′41″N 0°07′18″W	1234320	2–10 Tavistock Street More images
156–162 Oxford Street	City of Westminster	Office	1906-8	21 August 1975	TQ2927681318; 51°30′58″N 0°08′18″W	1357395	156–162 Oxford Street More images
3 and 5 Porchester Terrace	City of Westminster	Semi Detached House	BY 1825	5 February 1970	TQ2614680724; 51°30′41″N 0°11′01″W	1226990	3 and 5 Porchester Terrace More images
1 and 3–10 Adelaide Street and 430, 434–437, 440 and 449 Strand, and 5 and 7 William IV Street	City of Westminster	Shop	1830-2	2 July 1969	TQ3018880575; 51°30′33″N 0°07′32″W	1237040	1 and 3–10 Adelaide Street and 430, 434–437, 440 and 449 Strand, and 5 and 7 William IV Street More images
1–3 Arlington Street and 157–160 Piccadilly	City of Westminster	Showroom	1921	30 May 1972	TQ2911480356; 51°30′27″N 0°08′28″W	1265803	1–3 Arlington Street and 157–160 Piccadilly More images
6–10 Adam Street	Strand, City of Westminster	Terrace	1768–74	24 February 1958	TQ3042280646; 51°30′35″N 0°07′19″W	1209725	6–10 Adam Street More images
1–7 Meard Street	Soho, City of Westminster	Terrace	c. 1732	24 February 1958	TQ2966681021; 51°30′48″N 0°07′58″W	1222744	1–7 Meard Street More images
2–6 Meard Street	Soho, City of Westminster	Terrace	1732	24 February 1958	TQ2965381037; 51°30′48″N 0°07′59″W	1222690	2–6 Meard Street More images
9 and 11 Meard Street	Soho, City of Westminster	Terraced House	c. 1732	24 February 1958	TQ2964981016; 51°30′48″N 0°07′59″W	1222689	9 and 11 Meard Street More images
13–21 Meard Street	Soho, City of Westminster	Terrace	1732	24 February 1958	TQ2963281006; 51°30′47″N 0°08′00″W	1267631	13–21 Meard Street More images
1–4 and 23 Suffolk Place and 3 Haymarket	City of Westminster	Terrace	1822-3	5 February 1970	TQ2980880489; 51°30′30″N 0°07′51″W	1237155	1–4 and 23 Suffolk Place and 3 Haymarket More images
5–13 Mansfield Street	Marylebone, W1	Terrace	1770-5	10 September 1954	TQ2871481648; 51°31′09″N 0°08′47″W	1273679	5–13 Mansfield Street More images
1–10 Victoria Square	Victoria, SW1	Terrace	1838–1839	24 February 1958	TQ2885879257; 51°29′51″N 0°08′42″W	1274348	1–10 Victoria Square More images
2, 4, 5, 7, 8, 10, and 11 Lord North Street	Westminster	Terrace	c1720-5	24 February 1958	TQ3011579184; 51°29′48″N 0°07′37″W	1274699	2, 4, 5, 7, 8, 10, and 11 Lord North Street More images
13–19 Lord North Street	Westminster	Terrace	c1720-5	24 February 1958	TQ3009579179; 51°29′48″N 0°07′38″W	1222312	13–19 Lord North Street More images
3–11 Upper Belgrave Street	City of Westminster	Terrace	Early/Mid 19th century	24 February 1958	TQ2849879325; 51°29′54″N 0°09′01″W	1275140	3–11 Upper Belgrave Street More images
1 Barton Street	Westminster, City of Westminster	Terraced House	c. 1722	24 February 1958	TQ3006479282; 51°29′51″N 0°07′40″W	1217989	1 Barton Street More images
3 Barton Street	Westminster, City of Westminster	Terraced House	c. 1722	24 February 1958	TQ3006479270; 51°29′51″N 0°07′40″W	1357196	3 Barton Street More images
4–6 Barton Street	Westminster, City of Westminster	Terrace	c. 1722	24 February 1958	TQ3006279260; 51°29′50″N 0°07′40″W	1292168	4–6 Barton Street More images
9 and 10 Barton Street	Westminster, City of Westminster	Terrace	c. 1722	1 December 1987	TQ3004179259; 51°29′50″N 0°07′41″W	1292177	9 and 10 Barton Street
11–14 Barton Street	Westminster, City of Westminster	Terrace	c. 1722	24 February 1958	TQ3004279272; 51°29′51″N 0°07′41″W	1066476	11–14 Barton Street More images
48–58 Broadwick Street	Soho, W1	Terrace	c1722-23	24 February 1958	TQ2938281034; 51°30′48″N 0°08′13″W	1219794	48–58 Broadwick Street More images
2 and 4–34 Eaton Place	City of Westminster	Terrace	Early 19th century	24 February 1958	TQ2847679296; 51°29′53″N 0°09′02″W	1356979	2 and 4–34 Eaton Place
17–21 Portland Place	Marylebone, City of Westminster	Terraced House	1776-c1780	10 September 1954	TQ2879981676; 51°31′10″N 0°08′42″W	1227027	17–21 Portland Place More images
26–30 Portland Place	Marylebone, City of Westminster	Terraced House	c1776-80	10 September 1954	TQ2885081690; 51°31′10″N 0°08′39″W	1227024	26–30 Portland Place More images
34–52 Portland Place	Marylebone, City of Westminster	Terrace	1776-c1780	10 September 1954	TQ2881781804; 51°31′14″N 0°08′41″W	1227025	Upload Photo
41–47 Portland Place	Marylebone, City of Westminster	Terraced House	1776-c1780	10 September 1954	TQ2873881833; 51°31′15″N 0°08′45″W	1265549	41–47 Portland Place More images
56 and 58 Portland Place	Marylebone, City of Westminster	Terraced House	1776-c1780	10 September 1954	TQ2880281843; 51°31′15″N 0°08′42″W	1227040	56 and 58 Portland Place More images
59–67 Portland Place	Marylebone, City of Westminster	Terraced House	1776-c1780	10 September 1954	TQ2872381927; 51°31′18″N 0°08′46″W	1227079	59–67 Portland Place More images
75 Portland Place	Marylebone, City of Westminster	Terraced House	1776-c1780	1 December 1987	TQ2869782007; 51°31′20″N 0°08′47″W	1265541	75 Portland Place
8 Buckingham Street	Strand, City of Westminster	Terraced House	c. 1675	24 February 1958	TQ3030580504; 51°30′30″N 0°07′26″W	1220234	8 Buckingham Street
9 Buckingham Street	Strand, City of Westminster	Terraced House	c. 1677	24 February 1958	TQ3030980500; 51°30′30″N 0°07′25″W	1066365	9 Buckingham Street
10 Buckingham Street	Strand, City of Westminster	Terraced House	1675–76	24 February 1958	TQ3031380497; 51°30′30″N 0°07′25″W	1220244	10 Buckingham Street
11 Buckingham Street	Strand, City of Westminster	Terraced House	c. 1675	24 February 1958	TQ3032180491; 51°30′30″N 0°07′25″W	1357255	Upload Photo
13 Buckingham Street	Strand, City of Westminster	Terraced House	c1675-76	24 February 1958	TQ3033880475; 51°30′29″N 0°07′24″W	1066366	Upload Photo
14 Buckingham Street	Strand, City of Westminster	Terraced House	c1679-80	24 February 1958	TQ3034580467; 51°30′29″N 0°07′24″W	1291063	14 Buckingham Street More images
17 Buckingham Street	Strand, City of Westminster	Terraced House	1675–76	24 February 1958	TQ3034980498; 51°30′30″N 0°07′23″W	1066367	17 Buckingham Street More images
18 Buckingham Street	Strand, City of Westminster	Terraced House	1675-6	24 February 1958	TQ3034380503; 51°30′30″N 0°07′24″W	1220318	18 Buckingham Street More images
19 Buckingham Street	Strand, City of Westminster	Terraced House	1794	24 February 1958	TQ3033280512; 51°30′31″N 0°07′24″W	1357256	19 Buckingham Street More images
20 Buckingham Street	Strand, City of Westminster	Terraced House	c. 1675	24 February 1958	TQ3032080521; 51°30′31″N 0°07′25″W	1066368	20 Buckingham Street More images
21 Buckingham Street	Strand, City of Westminster	Terraced House	c. 1700	9 January 1970	TQ3031580524; 51°30′31″N 0°07′25″W	1291045	21 Buckingham Street More images
33 Upper Brook Street	City of Westminster	Terraced House	1756–57	24 February 1958	TQ2803680730; 51°30′40″N 0°09′23″W	1066221	Upload Photo
36 Upper Brook Street	Mayfair, City of Westminster	Terraced House	1737	24 February 1958	TQ2805880738; 51°30′40″N 0°09′22″W	1275019	36 Upper Brook Street
4 Haymarket	City of Westminster	Terraced House	1822-3	14 January 1970	TQ2978580474; 51°30′30″N 0°07′53″W	1066640	4 Haymarket
11 Great George Street	St James's, City of Westminster	Terraced House	c1755-6	24 February 1958	TQ3001279672; 51°30′04″N 0°07′42″W	1066741	11 Great George Street More images
18 Adam Street	Strand, City of Westminster	Terraced House	1768–74	24 February 1958	TQ3040280634; 51°30′35″N 0°07′20″W	1066515	18 Adam Street
92 and 94 Harley Street	City of Westminster	Terraced House	c. 1777	10 September 1954	TQ2861681843; 51°31′15″N 0°08′51″W	1066663	Upload Photo
16 Buckingham Gate	St James, City of Westminster	Terraced House	1706	24 February 1958	TQ2917079500; 51°29′59″N 0°08′26″W	1066360	16 Buckingham Gate
3 Cavendish Square	City of Westminster	Terraced House	c. 1740	10 September 1954	TQ2888481366; 51°30′59″N 0°08′38″W	1066305	3 Cavendish Square
20 Hanover Square	City of Westminster	Terraced House	c1718-20	24 February 1958	TQ2883881048; 51°30′49″N 0°08′41″W	1066691	20 Hanover Square More images
11 Hertford Street	Mayfair, City of Westminster	Terraced House	c1770-1	1 December 1987	TQ2863080146; 51°30′20″N 0°08′53″W	1066653	11 Hertford Street
72 Brook Street	Mayfair, City of Westminster	Terraced House	1726	24 February 1958	TQ2854180932; 51°30′46″N 0°08′56″W	1357223	72 Brook Street
76 Brook Street	Mayfair, City of Westminster	Terraced House	1726	24 February 1958	TQ2852780928; 51°30′46″N 0°08′57″W	1066380	76 Brook Street More images
88 Brook Street	Mayfair, City of Westminster	Terraced House	1725	9 January 1970	TQ2846180907; 51°30′45″N 0°09′01″W	1219840	88 Brook Street
5 Hamilton Place	Mayfair, City of Westminster	Terraced House	1807–10	2 October 1969	TQ2845980004; 51°30′16″N 0°09′02″W	1066716	5 Hamilton Place More images
16 Great College Street	City of Westminster	Terraced House	C1720-22	24 February 1958	TQ3008379289; 51°29′51″N 0°07′39″W	1213336	16 Great College Street
17 and 18 Great College Street	City of Westminster	Terraced House	1720–22	24 February 1958	TQ3007379293; 51°29′51″N 0°07′39″W	1357039	17 and 18 Great College Street
19 Great College Street	City of Westminster	Terraced House	c. 1722	24 February 1958	TQ3006479295; 51°29′52″N 0°07′40″W	1213357	19 Great College Street More images
32 Essex Street	City of Westminster	Terraced House	BARBON HOUSE	24 February 1958	TQ3109080952; 51°30′44″N 0°06′44″W	1211757	32 Essex Street
2 John Adam Street	City of Westminster	Terraced House	c1772-4	24 February 1958	TQ3039580628; 51°30′34″N 0°07′21″W	1275742	Upload Photo
4 and 6 John Adam Street	City of Westminster	Terraced House	c1772-4	24 February 1958	TQ3038480620; 51°30′34″N 0°07′21″W	1216786	4 and 6 John Adam Street
72 Park Street	Mayfair, City of Westminster	Terraced House	c. 1729	1 December 1987	TQ2815880750; 51°30′40″N 0°09′17″W	1226245	72 Park Street
4 St. James's Square	City of Westminster	Terraced House	1675-7	5 February 1970	TQ2954480445; 51°30′29″N 0°08′05″W	1235767	4 St. James's Square More images
9 St. James's Square	St. James's, City of Westminster	Terraced House	1736	24 February 1958	TQ2945780406; 51°30′28″N 0°08′10″W	1235769	9 St. James's Square More images
11 St. James's Square	St. James's, City of Westminster	Terraced House	1736	5 February 1970	TQ2943780394; 51°30′28″N 0°08′11″W	1264888	11 St. James's Square
13 St. James's Square	City of Westminster	Terraced House	c1735-7	24 February 1958	TQ2941680380; 51°30′27″N 0°08′12″W	1235824	13 St. James's Square More images
29–35 Portland Place and 71 New Cavendish Street	Marylebone, City of Westminster	Terraced House	c1776-80	10 September 1954	TQ2875481731; 51°31′11″N 0°08′44″W	1227074	29–35 Portland Place and 71 New Cavendish Street More images
29 Sackville Street	City of Westminster	Terraced House	c. 1731	5 February 1970	TQ2925380632; 51°30′35″N 0°08′20″W	1235397	29 Sackville Street
36 Sackville Street	City of Westminster	Terraced House	c. 1731–1732	5 February 1970	TQ2928680573; 51°30′33″N 0°08′18″W	1235455	36 Sackville Street More images
13 Harley Street	City of Westminster	Terraced House	Mid to late 18th century	10 September 1954	TQ2870881437; 51°31′02″N 0°08′47″W	1229991	13 Harley Street More images
1 and 2 Smith Square	City of Westminster	Terraced House	1726	5 February 1970	TQ3007879145; 51°29′47″N 0°07′39″W	1264703	1 and 2 Smith Square More images
3–5 Smith Square	City of Westminster	Terraced House	1726	24 February 1958	TQ3009179149; 51°29′47″N 0°07′38″W	1236244	3–5 Smith Square More images
6 Smith Square	City of Westminster	Terraced House	1726	24 February 1958	TQ3011979151; 51°29′47″N 0°07′37″W	1236245	6 Smith Square More images
7–9 Smith Square	City of Westminster	Terraced House	1726	24 February 1958	TQ3013079153; 51°29′47″N 0°07′36″W	1236246	7–9 Smith Square More images
9 and 10 South Audley Street	City of Westminster	Terraced House	c. 1754	24 February 1958	TQ2842980400; 51°30′29″N 0°09′03″W	1236396	9 and 10 South Audley Street More images
12 South Audley Street	City of Westminster	Terraced House	1736-7	1 December 1987	TQ2842480414; 51°30′29″N 0°09′03″W	1236398	12 South Audley Street
71 South Audley Street	City of Westminster	Terraced House	1736	24 February 1958	TQ2838380438; 51°30′30″N 0°09′05″W	1264596	71 South Audley Street More images
73 South Audley Street	City of Westminster	Terraced House	1736	1 December 1987	TQ2838680426; 51°30′29″N 0°09′05″W	1236434	73 South Audley Street More images
74 South Audley Street	City of Westminster	Terraced House	1736	30 March 1987	TQ2838980416; 51°30′29″N 0°09′05″W	1236474	74 South Audley Street
31 St Martin's Lane	City of Westminster	Terraced House	c. 1635	15 January 1973	TQ3009880638; 51°30′35″N 0°07′36″W	1236021	31 St Martin's Lane
27 Southampton Street	City of Westminster	Terraced House	1706–1708	24 February 1958	TQ3038480805; 51°30′40″N 0°07′21″W	1236371	27 Southampton Street More images
3 Robert Street	City of Westminster	Terraced House	1768–1774	24 February 1958	TQ3037980539; 51°30′31″N 0°07′22″W	1235245	3 Robert Street More images
26 Soho Square	City of Westminster	Terraced House	1788–1789	24 February 1958	TQ2977581226; 51°30′54″N 0°07′52″W	1236302	26 Soho Square
13 Soho Square	City of Westminster	Terraced House	After 1677	23 November 1978	TQ2968881312; 51°30′57″N 0°07′57″W	1236284	13 Soho Square More images
13–18 Victoria Square and 6 Lower Grosvenor Place	Victoria, SW1	Terraced House	1838–1839	24 February 1958	TQ2886479294; 51°29′52″N 0°08′42″W	1238078	13–18 Victoria Square and 6 Lower Grosvenor Place
9 Conduit Street	Conduit Street, Mayfair, London W1	Terraced House	1779	24 February 1958	TQ2905680951; 51°30′46″N 0°08′30″W	1219898	9 Conduit Street More images
6–12 Queen Anne's Gate	City of Westminster	Terraced House	1837	5 February 1970	TQ2974779629; 51°30′03″N 0°07′56″W	1265413	6–12 Queen Anne's Gate
1–4 Pickering Place	City of Westminster	Terraced House	c1731-2	1 December 1987	TQ2934180165; 51°30′20″N 0°08′16″W	1265610	1–4 Pickering Place More images
5 Pickering Place	City of Westminster	Terraced House	c1731-2	24 February 1958	TQ2933580176; 51°30′21″N 0°08′16″W	1226933	5 Pickering Place
61 and 63 New Cavendish Street	City of Westminster	Terraced House	1775-7	10 September 1954	TQ2871481716; 51°31′11″N 0°08′46″W	1266745	61 and 63 New Cavendish Street More images
3 Savile Row	City of Westminster	Terraced House	c. 1733	24 February 1958	TQ2919880698; 51°30′38″N 0°08′23″W	1236103	3 Savile Row More images
11 Savile Row	City of Westminster	Terraced House	c. 1733	1 December 1987	TQ2916380747; 51°30′39″N 0°08′24″W	1264751	11 Savile Row More images
14 Savile Row	City of Westminster	Terraced House	c. 1733	24 February 1958	TQ2914980770; 51°30′40″N 0°08′25″W	1236105	14 Savile Row More images
90 Jermyn Street	St James's, City of Westminster	Terraced House	c. 1675	14 January 1970	TQ2937980449; 51°30′29″N 0°08′14″W	1277361	90 Jermyn Street More images
9 Little College Street	City of Westminster	Terraced House	c. 1722	5 February 1970	TQ3012479246; 51°29′50″N 0°07′37″W	1274781	9 Little College Street
37 King Street	Covent Garden, City of Westminster	Terraced House	1773-4	14 January 1970	TQ3025080880; 51°30′43″N 0°07′28″W	1275116	Upload Photo
43 King Street	Covent Garden, City of Westminster	Town House	1716–17	24 February 1958	TQ3028980907; 51°30′43″N 0°07′26″W	1221465	43 King Street More images
38 Grosvenor Square	Mayfair, City of Westminster	Terraced House	c. 1727	24 February 1958	TQ2836480696; 51°30′38″N 0°09′06″W	1288579	38 Grosvenor Square
34 Haymarket	City of Westminster	Terraced House	c. 1741	24 February 1958	TQ2966980656; 51°30′36″N 0°07′58″W	1357092	34 Haymarket More images
7 Albemarle Street	Piccadilly, City of Westminster	Terraced House	1732	24 February 1958	TQ2910880490; 51°30′31″N 0°08′28″W	1357179	7 Albemarle Street
17 Albemarle Street	Piccadilly, City of Westminster	Terraced House		24 February 1958	TQ2903680575; 51°30′34″N 0°08′31″W	1209824	17 Albemarle Street
50 Albemarle Street	Piccadilly, City of Westminster	Terraced House	c1710-20	24 February 1958	TQ2910480419; 51°30′29″N 0°08′28″W	1209871	50 Albemarle Street
11 Golden Square	Soho, City of Westminster	Terraced House	c. 1778	24 February 1958	TQ2942080837; 51°30′42″N 0°08′11″W	1357035	11 Golden Square More images
19–25 Victoria Square and 5 Lower Grosvenor Place	Victoria, SW1	Terraced House	1838–1839	24 February 1958	TQ2888079293; 51°29′52″N 0°08′41″W	1066180	19–25 Victoria Square and 5 Lower Grosvenor Place More images
34 Grosvenor Street	Mayfair, City of Westminster	Terraced House	1725-8	24 February 1958	TQ2857380810; 51°30′42″N 0°08′55″W	1066699	34 Grosvenor Street
31 and 32 Charles II Street and 33 St. James's Square	City of Westminster	Terraced House	1770-2	5 February 1970	TQ2958780375; 51°30′27″N 0°08′03″W	1235831	31 and 32 Charles II Street and 33 St. James's Square
1–10 Grosvenor Crescent	Belgravia, City of Westminster	Terraced House	Early 19th century	24 February 1958	TQ2822379592; 51°30′03″N 0°09′15″W	1214153	1–10 Grosvenor Crescent More images
15 St George's Street	City of Westminster	Terraced House	c. 1724	24 February 1958	TQ2891280963; 51°30′46″N 0°08′37″W	1235636	15 St George's Street
17 South Molton Street	City of Westminster	Terraced House	Late 18th century	5 February 1970	TQ2860881036; 51°30′49″N 0°08′53″W	1236522	17 South Molton Street More images
19 Hill Street	Mayfair, City of Westminster	Terraced House	c1748-9	24 February 1958	TQ2861480482; 51°30′31″N 0°08′53″W	1357120	19 Hill Street More images
92–96 Portland Street	Marylebone, City of Westminster	Terraced House	1776-c1780	5 February 1970	TQ2874582037; 51°31′21″N 0°08′44″W	1265548	92–96 Portland Street
18 Clifford Street and 24A Old Burlington Street	City of Westminster	Terraced House	1723	24 February 1958	TQ2907580745; 51°30′39″N 0°08′29″W	1356952	18 Clifford Street and 24A Old Burlington Street More images
16–22 Mansfield Street and 82 New Cavendish Street	Marylebone, W1	Terraced House	1770–76	10 September 1954	TQ2874281668; 51°31′09″N 0°08′45″W	1239532	16–22 Mansfield Street and 82 New Cavendish Street More images
14 Hay's Mews and 16 Charles Street	Mayfair, City of Westminster	Terraced House	1753	9 January 1970	TQ2866180407; 51°30′29″N 0°08′51″W	1217940	14 Hay's Mews and 16 Charles Street
21 Arlington Street	St James, City of Westminster	Town House	1738	24 February 1958	TQ2909480280; 51°30′24″N 0°08′29″W	1066497	21 Arlington Street
49 Belgrave Square	Knightsbridge, City of Westminster	Town House	c1840-50	24 February 1958	TQ2828679580; 51°30′02″N 0°09′11″W	1066460	49 Belgrave Square More images
1 Carlton Gardens	City of Westminster	Town House	c. 1828	9 January 1970	TQ2957880138; 51°30′19″N 0°08′04″W	1357247	1 Carlton Gardens More images
2 Carlton Gardens	City of Westminster	Town House	c. 1828	9 January 1970	TQ2958680123; 51°30′19″N 0°08′03″W	1209730	2 Carlton Gardens More images
3 Carlton Gardens	City of Westminster	Town House	c. 1828	9 January 1970	TQ2963780152; 51°30′20″N 0°08′01″W	1066349	3 Carlton Gardens More images
170 Queen's Gate	City of Westminster	Town House	1888	24 February 1958	TQ2649679244; 51°29′53″N 0°10′45″W	1227415	170 Queen's Gate More images
54 Mount Street	Mayfair, City of Westminster	Town House	1896-7	5 February 1970	TQ2823080552; 51°30′34″N 0°09′13″W	1223620	54 Mount Street More images
11 and 12 North Audley Street	Mayfair, City of Westminster	Town House	c1726-30	24 February 1958	TQ2825680946; 51°30′46″N 0°09′11″W	1225300	11 and 12 North Audley Street More images
39 Charles Street	Mayfair, City of Westminster	Town House	c1753-1753	24 February 1958	TQ2872280409; 51°30′29″N 0°08′48″W	1292197	39 Charles Street
6 and 7 Upper Harley Street	Regents Park, City of Westminster	Town House	1824–26	5 February 1970	TQ2847482194; 51°31′27″N 0°08′58″W	1357320	6 and 7 Upper Harley Street More images
39 and 39a Brook Street and 22 Avery Row	City of Westminster	House	Early 18th century	9 January 1970	TQ2870880951; 51°30′46″N 0°08′48″W	1219871	39 and 39a Brook Street and 22 Avery Row More images

== See also ==
- Grade I listed buildings in the City of Westminster
