= 4 Cowley Street =

House in London, England

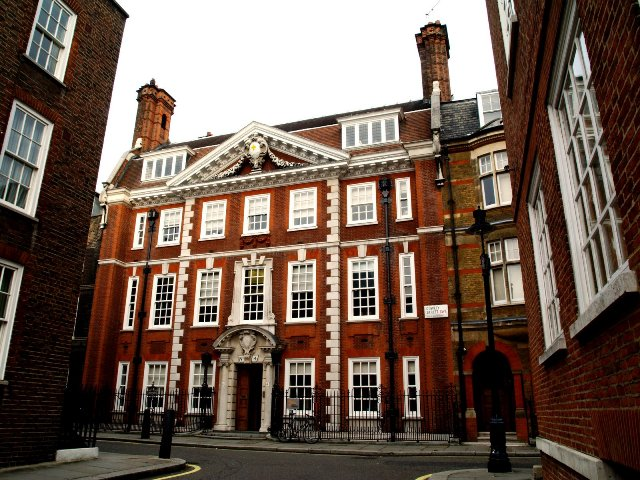

- Location in London

General information
- Location: 4 Cowley Street, London, United Kingdom
- Coordinates: 51°29′51″N 0°07′38″W
- Construction started: 1904
- Completed: 1905

Design and construction
- Architect: Horace Field

4 Cowley Street is a Grade II listed house in Westminster, London SW1. Previously the headquarters of the Social Democratic Party and the Liberal Democrats, it is now a residential building.

== History ==
The building was constructed in 1904–1905 by the architect Horace Field as offices for the North Eastern Railway.

English Heritage notes it as having "Lavish late C.17 style, rather out of scale with its neighbours but with fine Arts and Crafts quality of detailing by this early Neo-Georgian revivalist, and no doubt given more importance as it closes the north continuation into Cowley Street of Lord North Street axis."

The building became the headquarters of the SDP (Social Democratic Party) in the 1980s, and following the party's merger with the Liberal Party in 1988, it became home to the Liberal Democrats until 2011.

The building has been restored and refurbished by Saigol DDC as a single family house, rebranded as Mansion House, and is for sale at £36 million.
