= Barton Street and Cowley Street, Westminster =

Streets in the City of Westminster, in Central London

Barton Street and Cowley Street
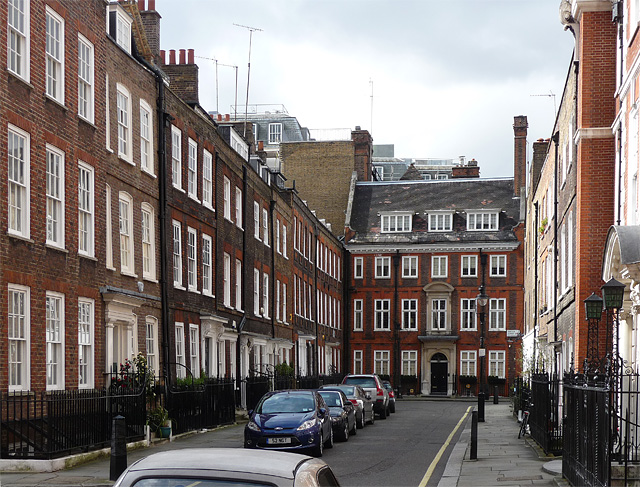
- A view along Cowley Street to Barton Street

- Location within City of Westminster
- Maintained by: Transport for London
- Location: Central London, Westminster, London
- Postal code: SW1
- Nearest Tube station: Westminster
- Coordinates: 51.4971°N 0.1279°W
- North end: Great College Street
- South end: Great Peter Street

Barton Street and Cowley Street are two short streets in Westminster, London. They were developed in the 18th century by the actor Barton Booth, the former taking his first name, and the latter the name of an estate he owned at Cowley, then in Middlesex to the west of London. The streets' proximity to the Palace of Westminster has made them a popular choice for politicians looking for homes within Parliament's division bell area; the Liberal politician Walter Runciman lived at No.8, Barton Street in the 20th century, and Jacob Rees-Mogg lives at No.7, Cowley Street in the 21st. They have also attracted other notables including; T. E. Lawrence, who wrote much of his Seven Pillars of Wisdom at No. 14, Barton Street; the actor, John Gielgud, who lived at No. 16, Cowley Street and the composer Ralph Vaughan Williams, who had a six-year tenure at No.10, Barton Street. Many of the buildings are listed, most at the second highest grade, II*. Simon Bradley and Nikolaus Pevsner, in the sixth London volume in the Buildings of England series, describe Barton Street and Cowley Street as, "among the most perfect Early Georgian streets in Westminster".

== Location ==
Barton Street and Cowley Street run in a dog-leg from Great Peter Street in the south to Great College Street in the north, lying to the south of the grounds of Westminster School.

== History and description ==
These narrow houses, three or four storeys high - one for eating, one for sleeping, a third for company, a fourth underground for the kitchen, a fifth perhaps at the top for servants - give the idea of a cage with its sticks and birds

— Louis Simond - Journal of a Tour and Residence in Great Britain (1817)

Barton Booth (1682 – 1733) was among the most successful actors of the 18th century. He invested some of the profits of his success in property development, laying out Barton Street, named after himself, and Cowley Street, named after his country estate in Middlesex, from 1722. (Note: While most sources ascribe the naming of Cowley Street to his Middlesex manor, it has been suggested that the street was named in honour of Abraham Cowley, a fellow Old Westminster and Booth's favourite poet.) Booth was familiar with the area having been educated at Westminster School, just to the north.

Simon Bradley and Nikolaus Pevsner, in the 2003 revised London 6: Westminster in the Buildings of England series, consider the streets, "among the most perfect Early Georgian streets in Westminster". Westminster City Council noted the unusual residential nature of the streets, together with Lord North Street and Gayfere Street, describing them as "remarkable surviving residential terraces". The houses are mainly of London stock brick, of three storeys with basements and attics and with decorated doorcases. Their layout follows what John Summerson called "the insistent verticality of the London house" [see box]. There are some later insertions, mainly of the later 19th and 20th centuries, including: Corner House, which incorporates No.11, Cowley Street, and No.8, Little College Street, and dates from 1911 and is by Edwin Lutyens; No.4, Cowley Street, of 1904 by Horace Field and described by Historic England as "rather out of scale with its neighbours"; and No.8 Barton Street, of 1909 and also by Field.

== Buildings, occupants and listing designations ==
=== Barton Street ===
- No.1 - Grade II* listed.
- No.3 - Grade II* listed.
- No.4, No.5 and No.6 - Grade II* listed. Lord Reith, the first general manager, and later Director general of the British Broadcasting Corporation (BBC) lived at No.6. In May 1926, the then prime minister, Stanley Baldwin, made a broadcast about the General Strike from Reith's study at the house. (Note: The broadcast was controversial; Ramsay MacDonald, the leader of the opposition Labour Party, complaining that the BBC was showing partisanship towards the government and breaching its own impartiality. Some sources incorrectly state that the broadcast was made by Reith.) No.6 retains features from its earlier 18th century role as a pub.
- No.8 - Grade II listed, of 1909 by Horace Field. Home of the politician Walter Runciman, and later the official residence of the Bishop of London from 1975. The Runcimans’ refurbishment of the property in the mid-1920s led to an exchange of letters in The Times with it being seen as an example of "the poor being crowded out by the well-to-do" by the Housing Committee of Westminster City Council amidst pressures for housing stock for the working classes. In 2001 it was owned by the banker and Conservative councillor Colin Barrow and was the headquarters of Michael Portillo's campaign for the leadership of the Conservative Party.
- No.9 and No.10 - Grade II* listed. No.10 was the home of Ralph Vaughan Williams where he composed A Cambridge Mass, Bucolic Suite and Heroic Elegy.
- No.11, No.12, No.13 and No.14 - Grade II* listed. T. E. Lawrence wrote much of the third draft of the Seven Pillars of Wisdom at No.14, Barton Street. Lawrence occupied the attic, the rest of the building being the architectural offices of Herbert Baker, Lutyens' partner in the design of New Delhi.

=== Cowley Street ===
- No.1 - Grade II* listed.
- No.2 and No.3 - Grade II* listed.
- No.4 - Grade II listed. Built by Horace Field as the London headquarters of the North Eastern Railway. Later the headquarters of the Liberal Democrats, it was renovated and marketed as a private home in 2017. (Note: In 2024 the building, renamed Mansion House, was available for long or short-term lets, at a rate of £21,250 per week.)
- No.7. The home of Jacob Rees-Mogg, formerly owned by Michael Ashcroft.
- Corner House, including No.11 - Grade II listed. Designed by Lutyens for Francis McLaren, a politician and pilot killed in the First World War. (Note: Lutyens also designed McLaren's memorial at Busbridge in Surrey.)
- No.13 - Grade II* listed.
- No.14 - Grade II* listed.
- No.15 - Grade II* listed.
- No.16 and No.17 - Grade II* listed. No.16 was the home of the actor John Gielgud.
- No.18 - Grade II* listed.
- No.19 - Grade II* listed, and reconstructed and extended by Detmar Blow in the 1920s. In the 19th century, the house was home to John Thomas Serres, a marine artist and founder of The Old Vic. (Note: John Thomas Serres was ruined by his wife, Olivia's claims to be the illegitimate daughter of the Duke of Cumberland, a claim she pursued loudly and publicly, causing Serres to lose favour at court.) In the 20th century, Chris Patten used No.19 as his London home while serving as the last Governor of Hong Kong.

== Gallery ==
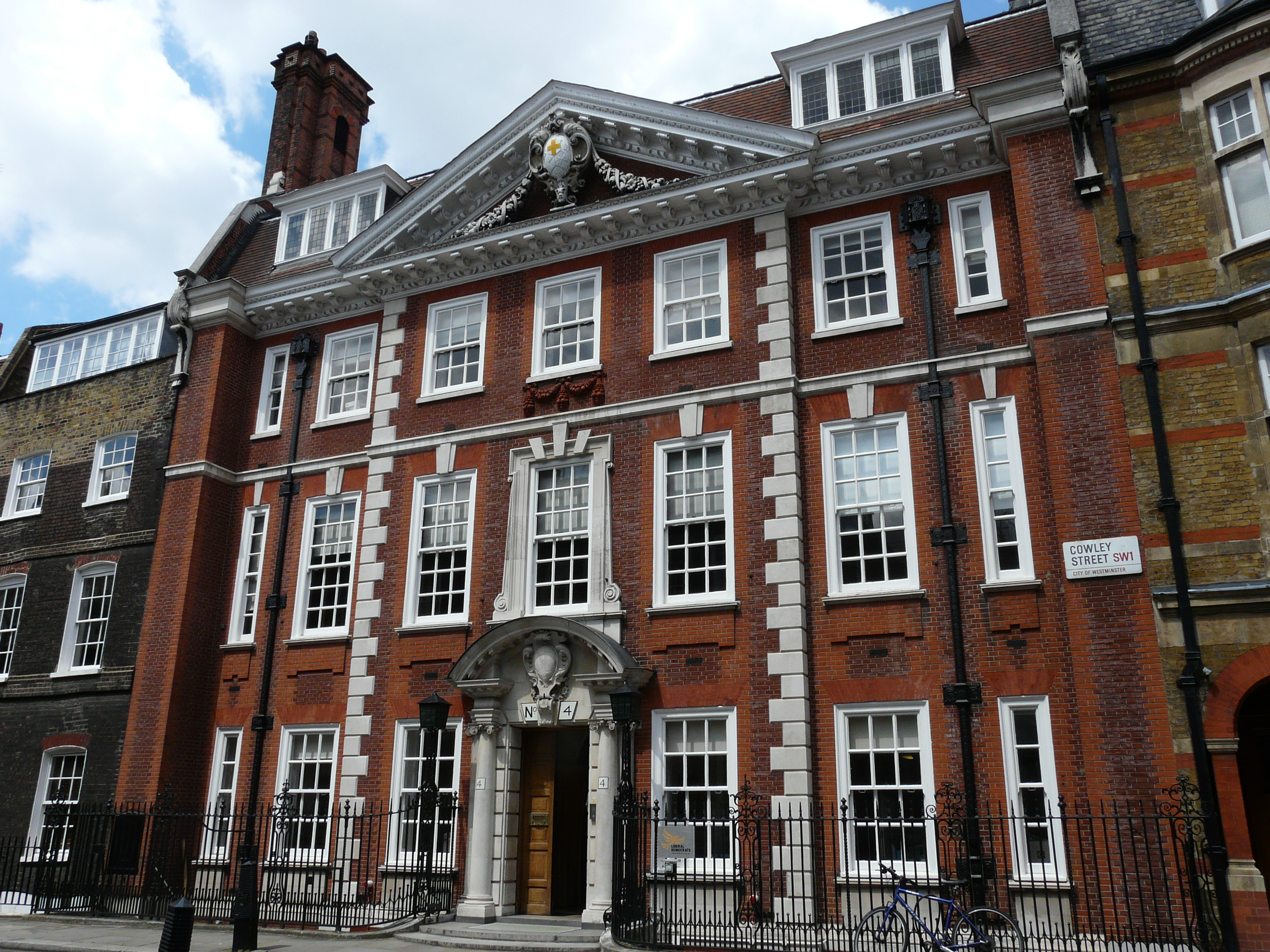
No.4, Cowley Street - "rather out of scale with its neighbours"

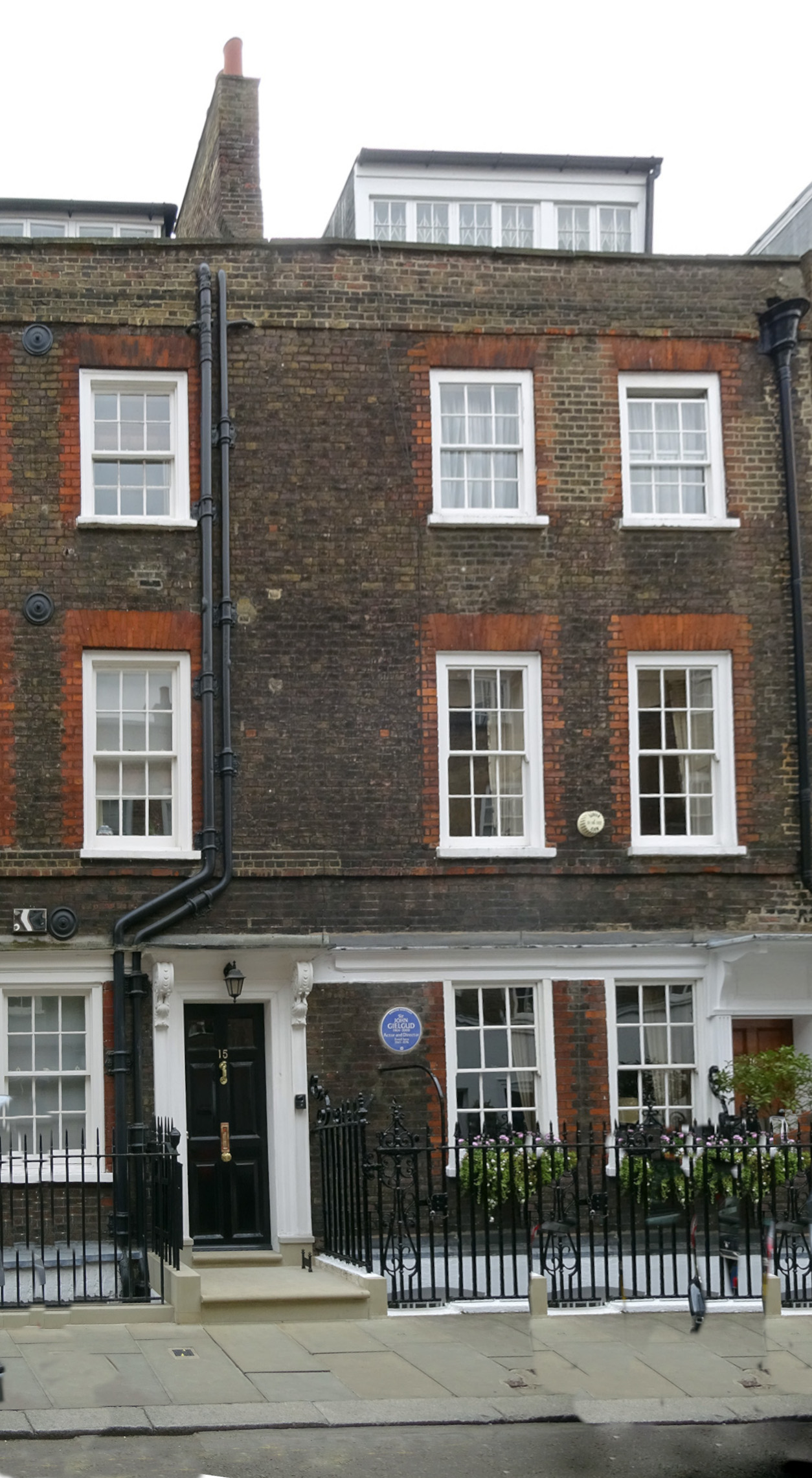
Sir John Gielgud's house at No.16, Cowley Street

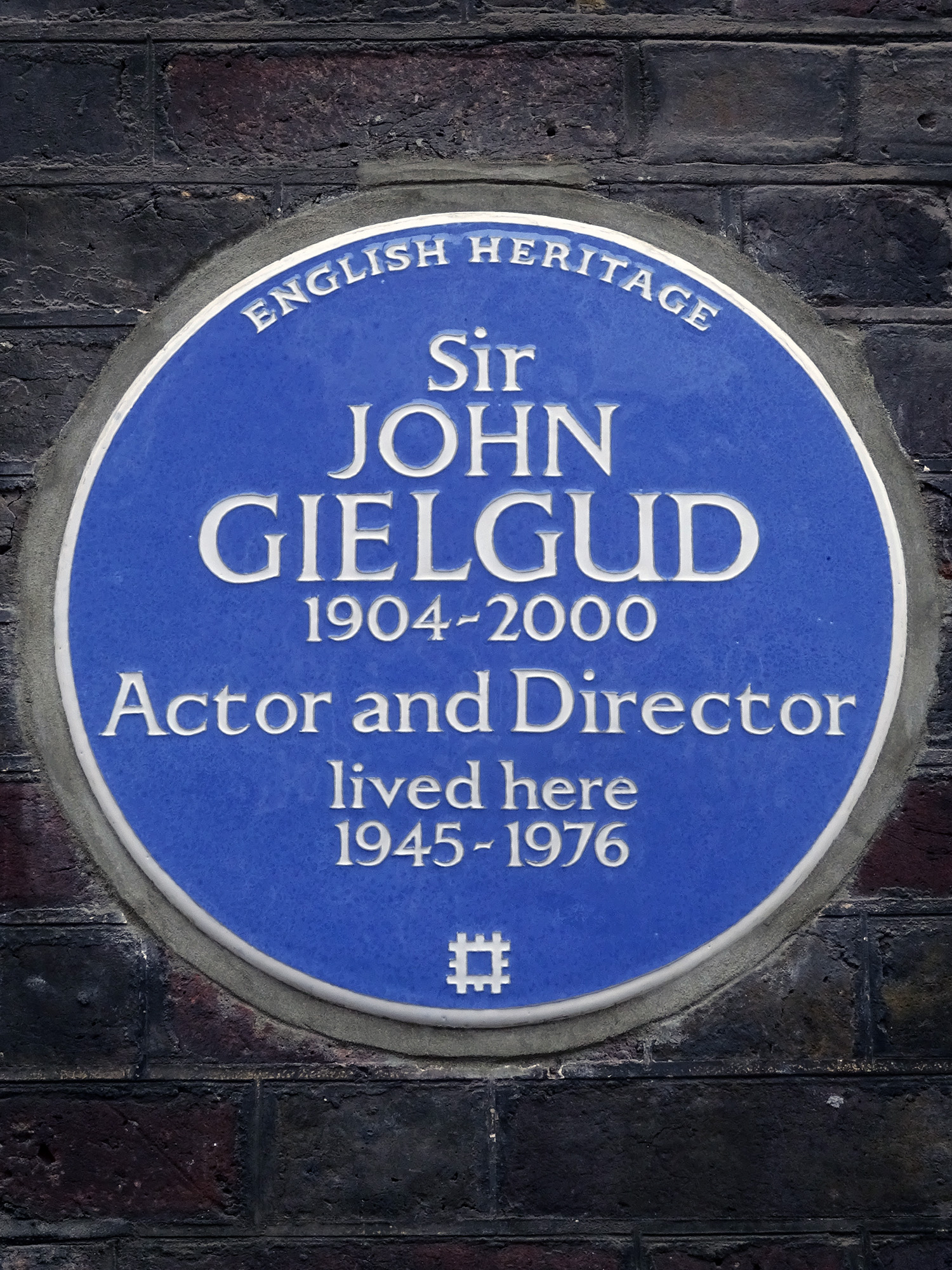
The Gielgud plaque

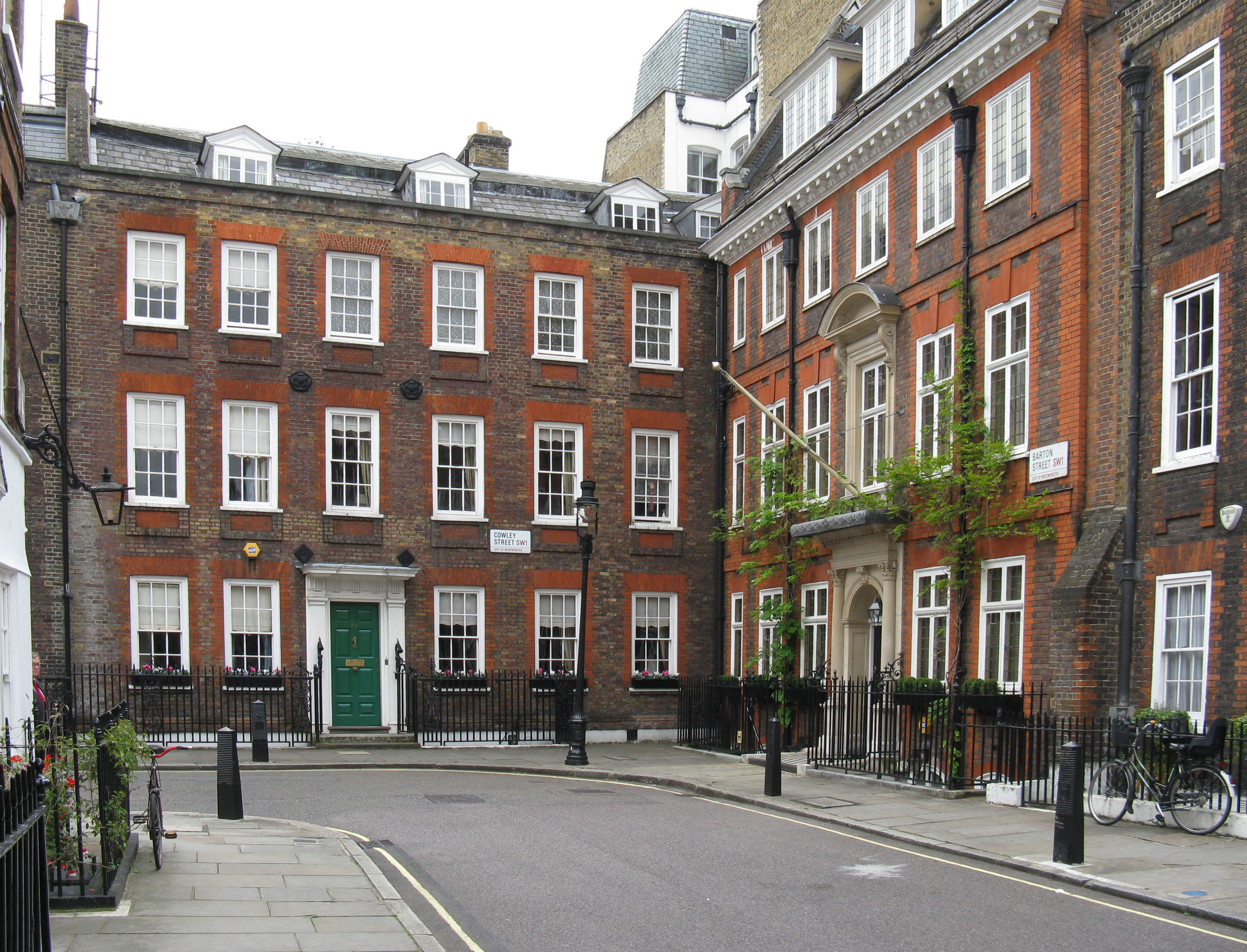
The junction of Cowley and Barton Streets, showing No.19, Cowley Street on the left, and No.8, Barton Street on the right

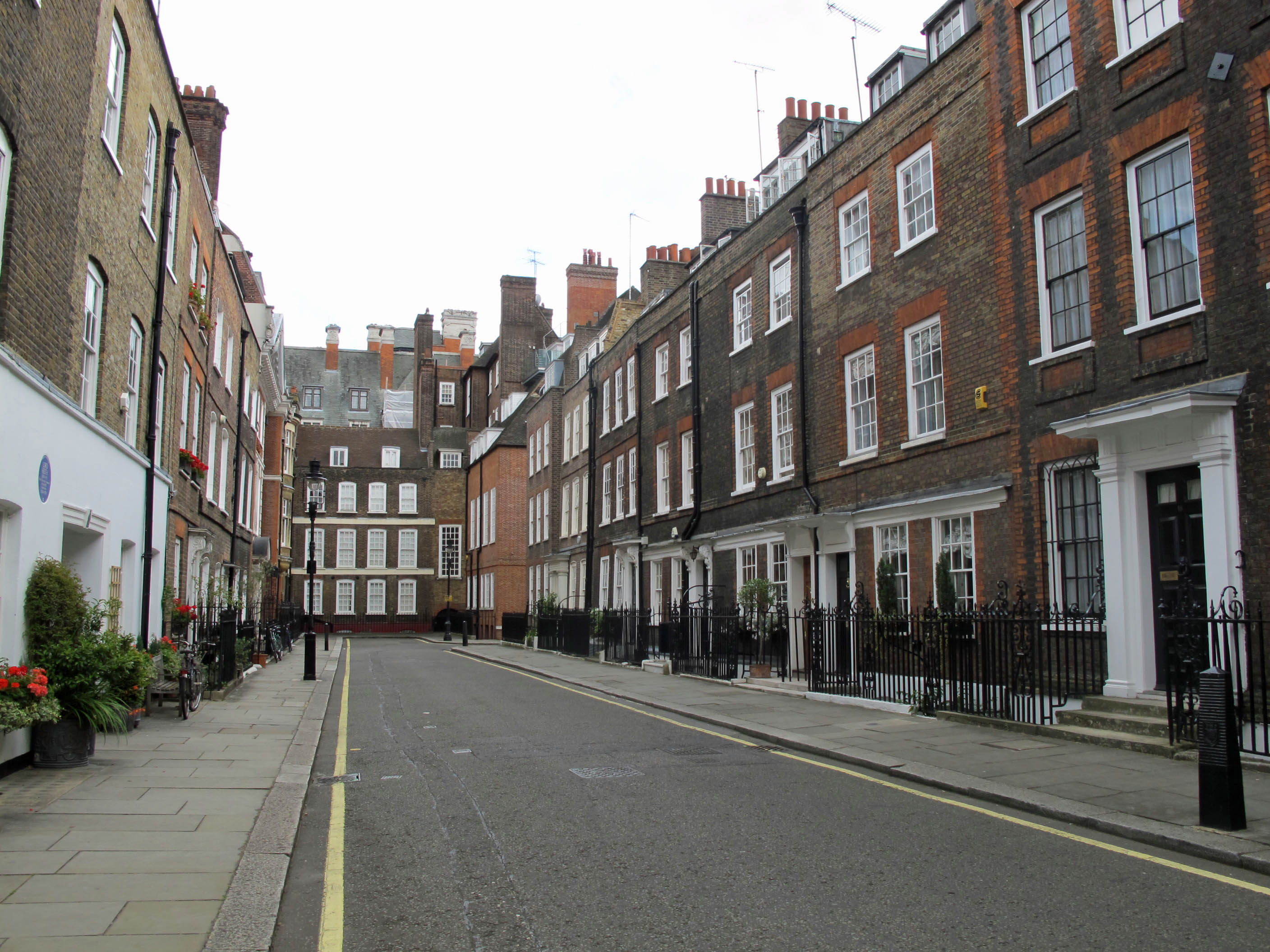
View along Barton Street

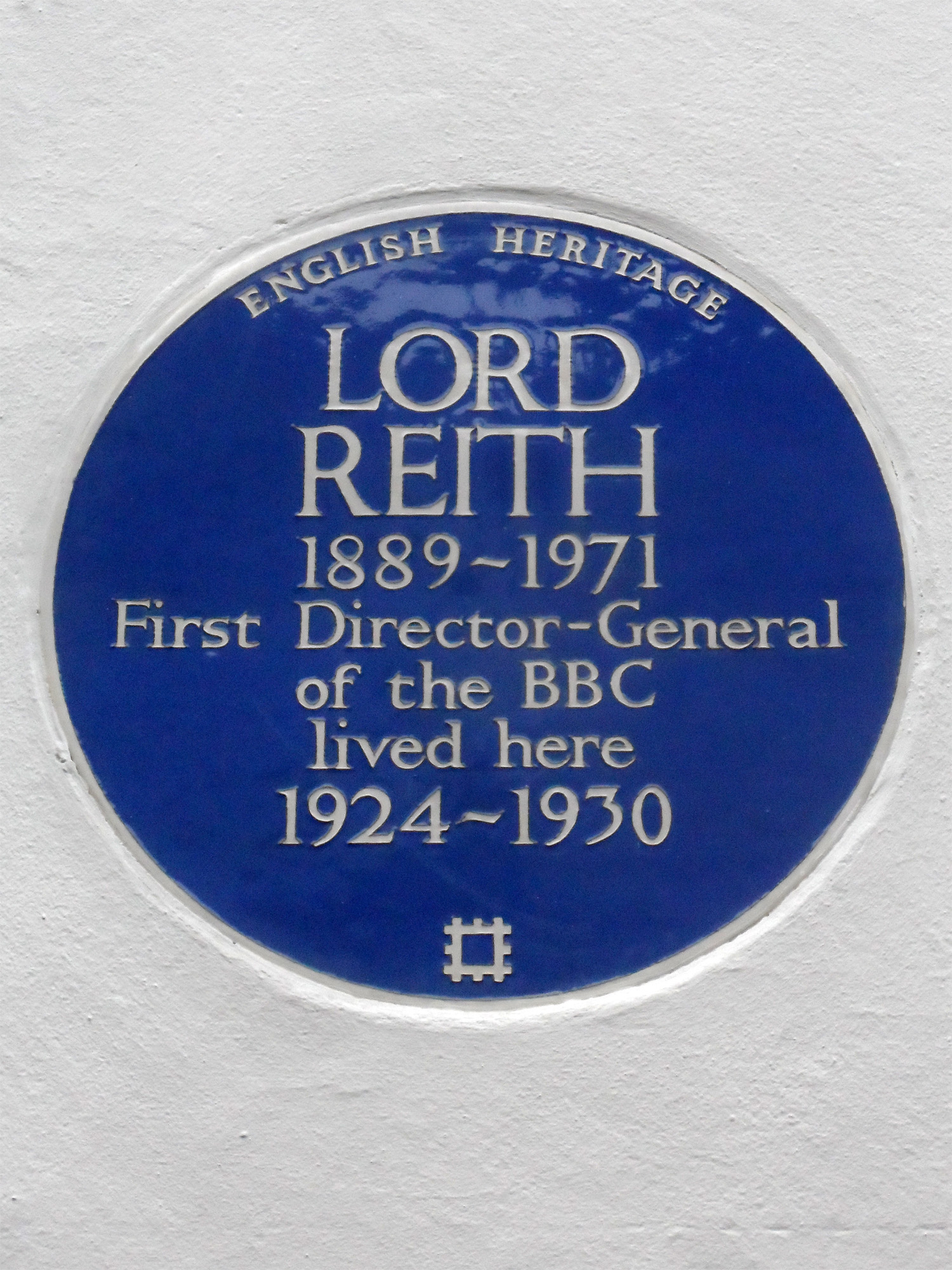
The Reith plaque

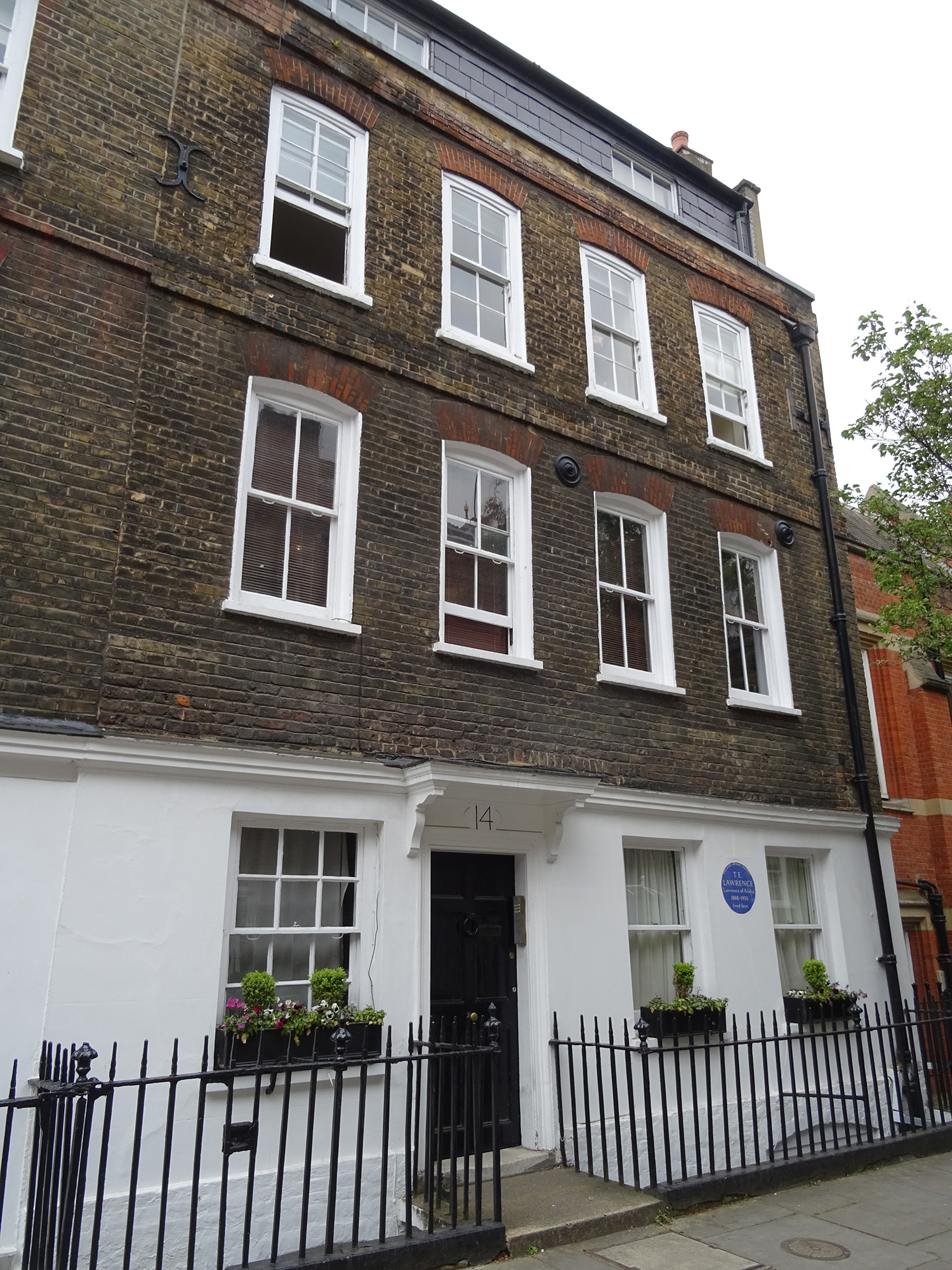
T.E.Lawrence at No.14, Barton Street

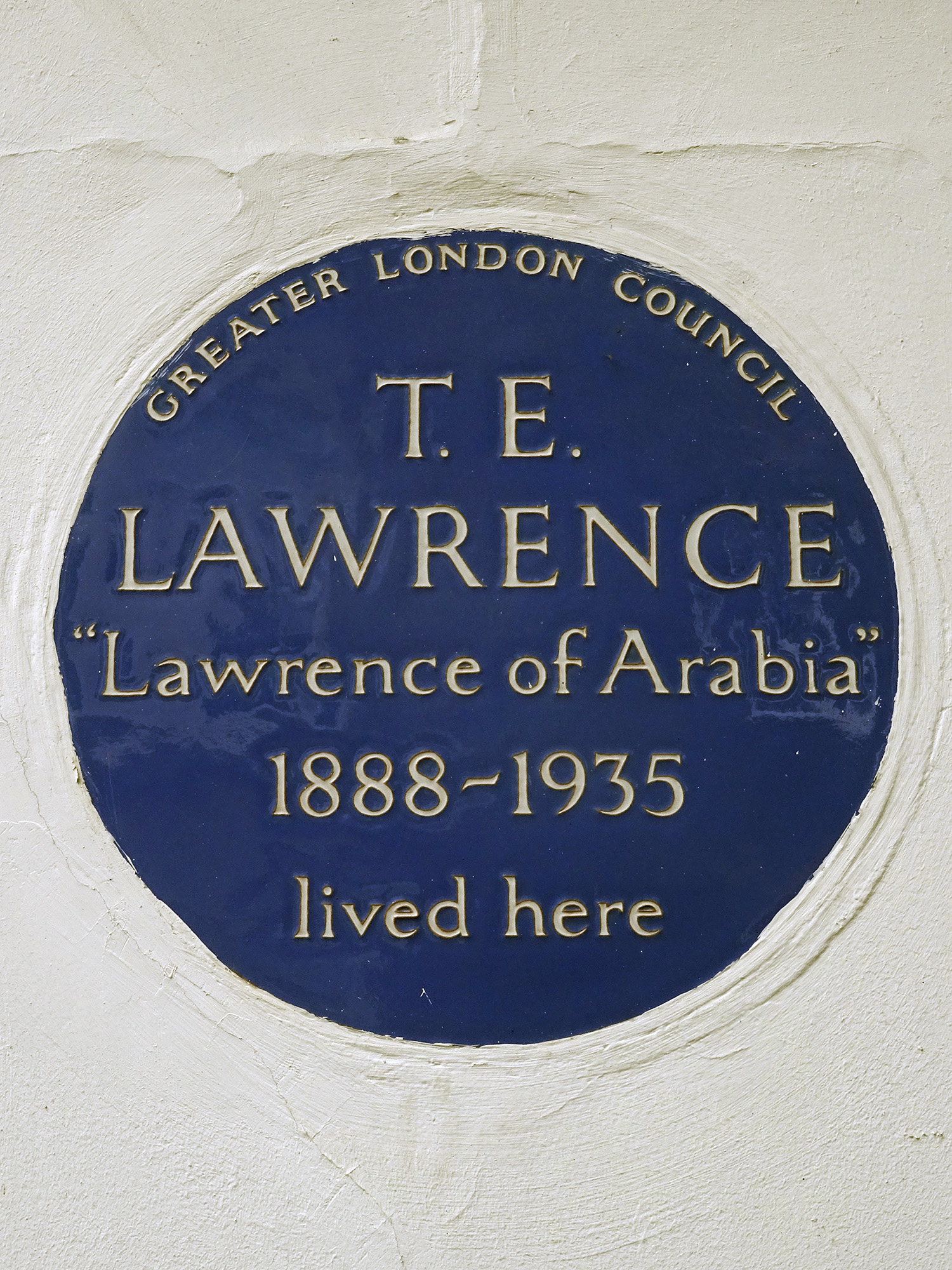
The Lawrence plaque

== Sources ==
- Bradley, Simon; Pevsner, Nikolaus (2003). London: Westminster. The Buildings of England. New Haven, US, London, UK: Yale University Press. ISBN 9780300095951. OCLC 609428632.
- Kendall, Paul (2024). Lawrence of Arabia: Colonel T.E Lawrence CB, DSO – Places and Objects of Interest. Barnsley, UK: Pen and Sword Books. ISBN 978-1-399-07194-9.
- Summerson, John (1978). Georgian London. London: Barrie & Jenkins. OCLC 922574924.
- Westminster City Council, ed. (2005). Smith Square Conservation Area Audit (PDF).
