= Mansfield Street, London =

Street in Marylebone, London

Coordinates: 51.51881°N 0.14585°W

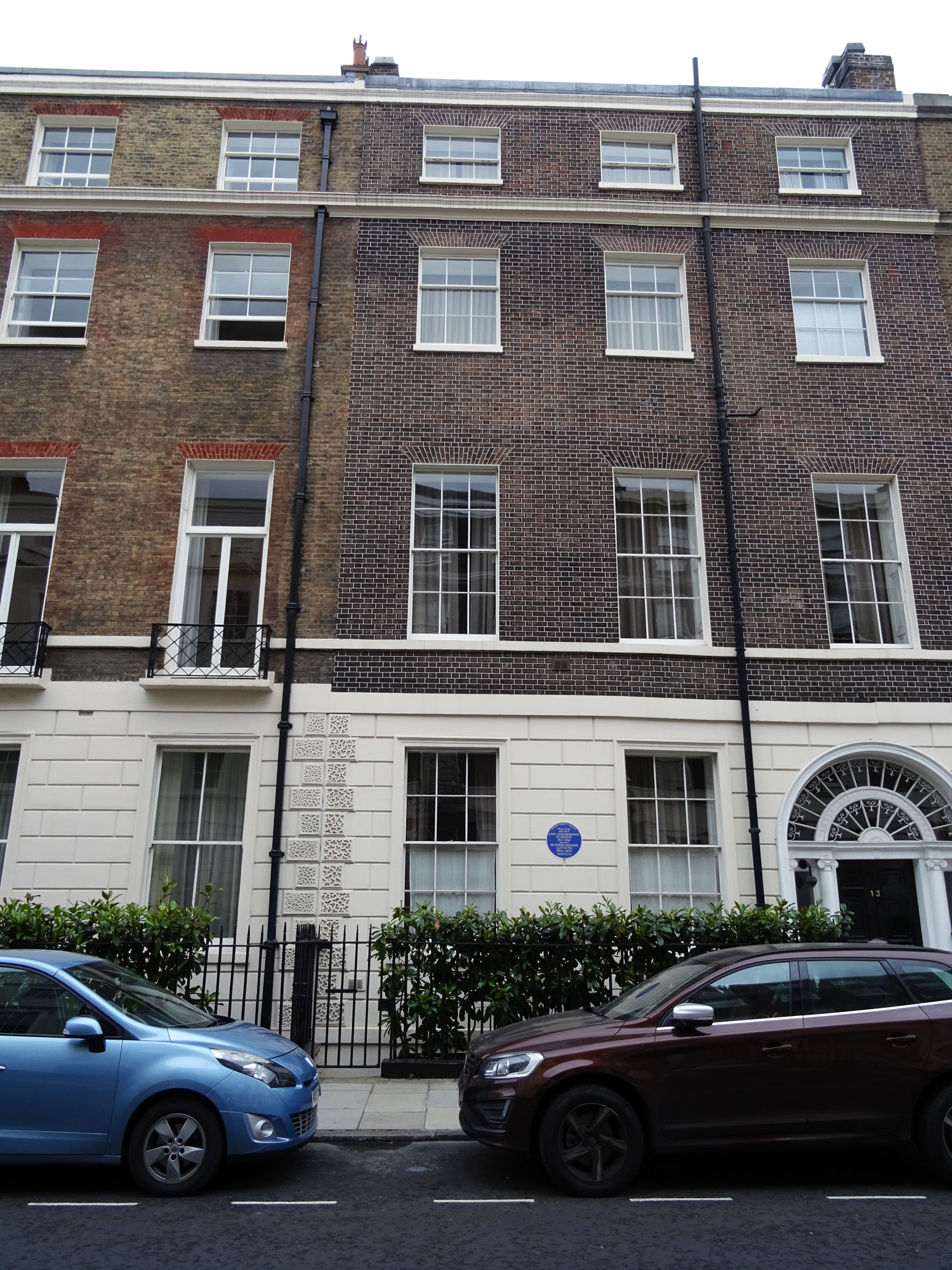
13 Mansfield Street in 2015, home to architects John Loughborough Pearson, and Sir Edwin Lutyens

Mansfield Street is a street in the Marylebone district of central London.

It runs roughly north to south from New Cavendish Street to Queen Anne Street. About halfway, there are t-junctions with Duchess Street, off to the east, and Mansfield Mews, off to the west.

5-13 and 16–22 are all grade II* listed. They were designed by Robert and James Adam, and built in 1770–75.

== Notable people ==
No. 13 was the home of the architect John Loughborough Pearson, and the home and office of architect Sir Edwin Lutyens, from 1919 to his death in 1944.

No. 18 was the birthplace of the biochemist Rosalind Pitt-Rivers in 1907 (as Rosalind Venetia Henley).

No. 2 was the home of music philanthropist Robert Mayer.
