= 3 Carlton Gardens =

Heritage house in London, United Kingdom

Coordinates: 51.50544°N 0.133525°W

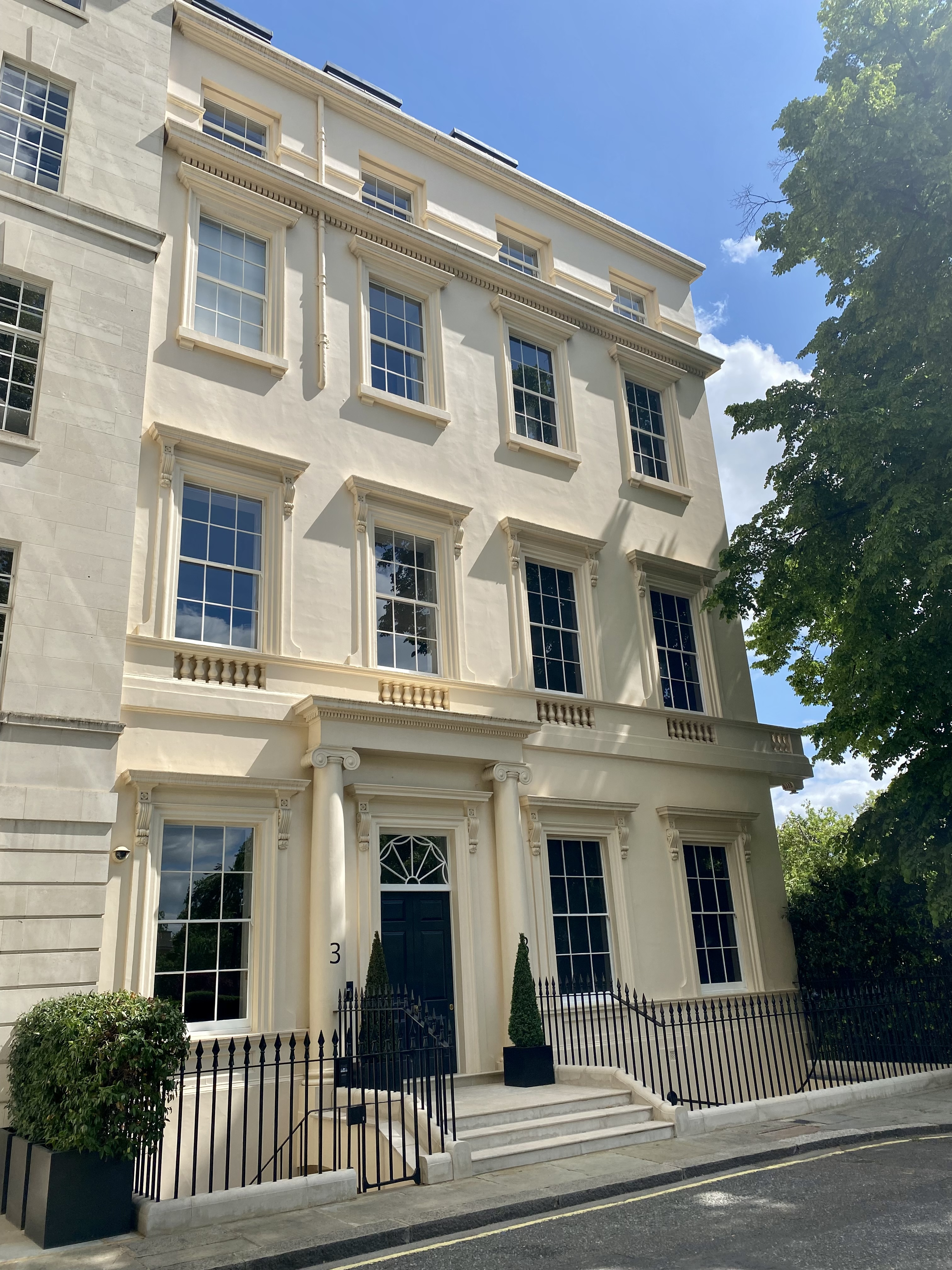
3 Carlton Gardens in May 2022

3 Carlton Gardens is a house in Carlton Gardens, cul-de-sac at the west end of Carlton House Terrace in London's St James's district SW1. The house was designed by Decimus Burton as part of a pair. It has been listed Grade II* on the National Heritage List for England since January 1970.

The house is three storeys tall plus an attic storey; and four windows wide. A balustraded balcony is on the first floor. The house has a swimming pool and spa, and private formal gardens.

In 1843, it was residence to the politician Frederick Hodgson, MP for Barnstaple. In 1856 it was the home of the Conservative MP for Buteshire, James Stuart-Wortley. The house was the residence of the Conservative politician and army officer George Weld-Forester, 3rd Baron Forester in the 1870s; Weld-Forester died at the property in 1886.

The house was used by the Secret Intelligence Service (MI6) to interview recruits after the Second World War.

In 2012, the house was bought by the property developer Mike Spink for £65.5 million, who subsequently renovated the property. The property was listed at £125 million for several years until its 2019 sale to the American hedge fund manager Kenneth C. Griffin, the founder and CEO of Citadel LLC, for £95 million.

The 2019 sale of 3 Carlton Gardens was the most expensive sale of a UK property since 2011.
