= Victoria Square, London =

Residential square in Victoria, London

Coordinates: 51°29′52″N 0°08′42″W

Victoria Square in 2023

Victoria Square is a small garden square in Belgravia, in the City of Westminster, London, lying between the Royal Mews of Buckingham Palace and Victoria station. (Note: 170 feet (52 m) by 75 feet (23 m), including roads, the few parking bays and the pavements) It was laid out in 1838–40 to designs by Matthew Wyatt and named to mark the start of Queen Victoria's reign. All of the stucco-fronted houses around it are Grade II* listed, and the central garden contains a statue of the young Queen Victoria.

== Architecture and history ==
No. 11 in September 1918, when it housed US Army recruiting and surgeon's offices

The site was previously occupied by Georgian terraces known as Arabella Row and King's Row, shown on Richard Horwood's map of 1799, which were demolished in the 1830s.

Fronting the square are 26 houses, all listed at Grade II*, the second-highest of the three grades given to buildings of special architectural or historic interest in England. These are five-storey stucco-fronted properties designed by architect Sir Matthew Wyatt (1805–1886), a member of the Wyatt family — son of sculptor Matthew Cotes Wyatt and the grandson of James Wyatt; seeing them built in 1838–40 to celebrate the beginning of Queen Victoria's reign.

The square was built on land belonging to the Grosvenor Estate, the Duke of Westminster's London property holding, which still owns much of Belgravia and Victoria. As elsewhere on the estate, the houses were let on long leases while the estate kept the freehold. The Leasehold Reform Act 1967 gave leaseholders of houses the right to buy their freeholds, and most of the houses in the square have since been bought outright in this way. The estate nevertheless keeps some control over their appearance through the Grosvenor Belgravia Estate Management Scheme, which requires its approval for external alterations even where the freehold has been sold. (Note: Approved by the High Court in 1973 under section 19 of the Leasehold Reform Act 1967.)

The houses on the short northern arm of the square were originally numbered separately as Albert Street, after Prince Albert. In 1902 the London County Council absorbed Albert Street into Victoria Square and renumbered the houses, with a minor further change in 1908; the former Nos 1 and 2 Albert Street, for example, became Nos 19 and 20 Victoria Square.

Nikolaus Pevsner described the square as "an extremely pretty enclave … on a scale chiefly reminiscent of the seaside".

== Renovation ==
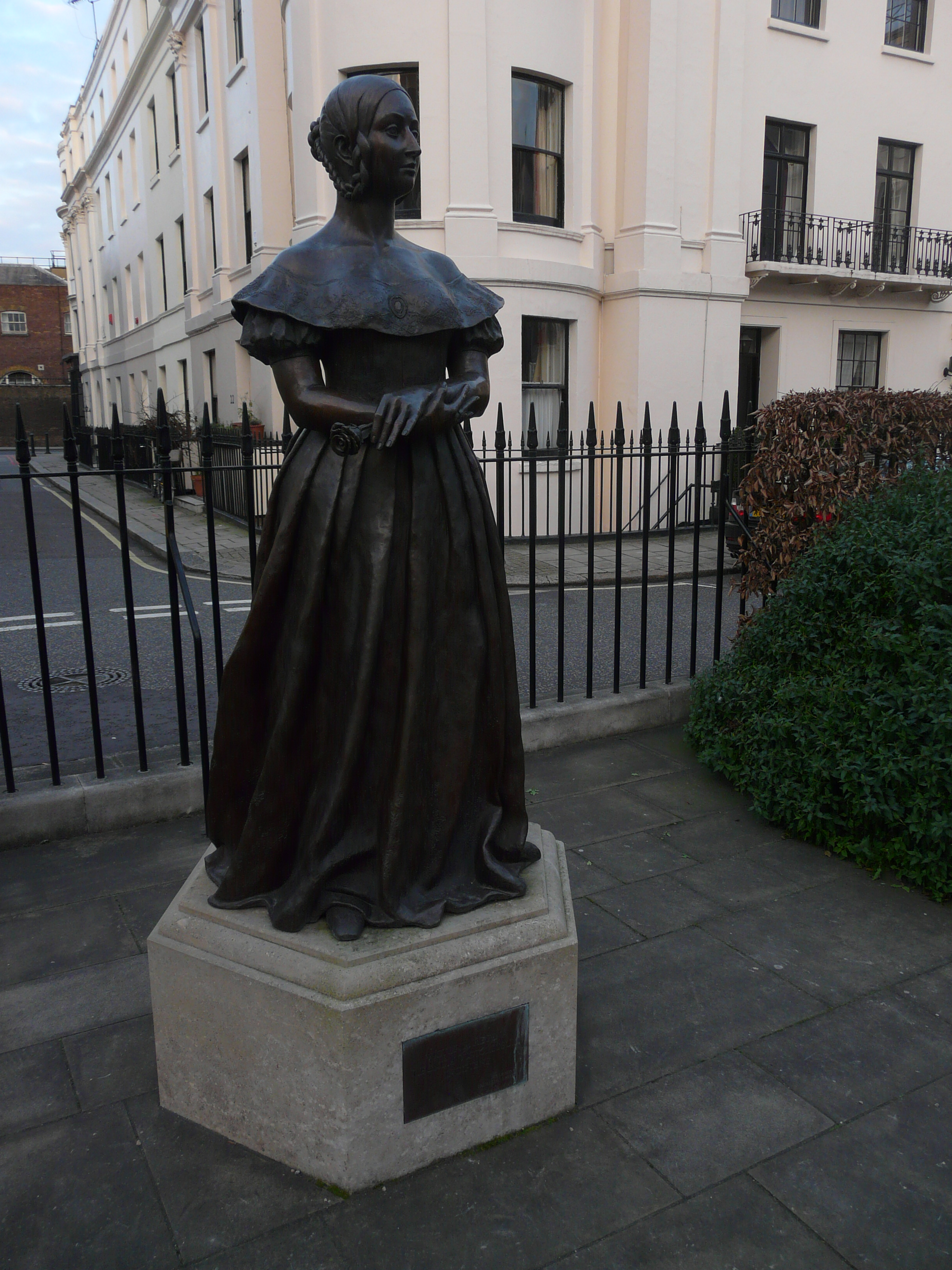
Young Queen Victoria by Catherine Anne Laugel, Victoria Square

The private gardens were renovated in the 2000s. Residents funded a new central garden, designed by John Rich and Associates, which was completed around 2005–06. A bronze statue of the young Queen Victoria by the French artist Catherine Laugel was installed in 2007.

== Former residents ==
Plaque to Thomas Campbell at No. 8

- Author Ian Fleming (1908–1964), from 1953 until his death in 1964 – at No. 16. The first of his James Bond novels, Casino Royale, was published shortly after he took the house, where he held a party after the premiere of From Russia with Love on 10 October 1963.
- Writer and publisher Leonard Woolf (1880–1969) – at No. 24.
- Musician and composer Mike Oldfield, for some time – at No. 1.
- Conservative government minister, later journalist and broadcaster, Michael Portillo (born 1953) – at No. 25.
- Poet Thomas Campbell (1777–1844), from 1840 to 1844 – at No. 8, where a commemorative plaque records his residence.
- Musician John Ella (1802–1888), from 1868 until his death in 1888 – at No. 9.
- Diplomat Sir Denis Wright (1911–2005), during the late 1940s and early 1950s – at No. 20.
- Conservative politician Nicholas Scott (1933–2005), during the 1970s – at No. 20.
- Army officer, artist and author Henry Hope Crealock (1831–1891), from at least 1871 until his death in 1891 – at No. 25 (then No. 20).

== Appearances in film ==
In 1991 the square was used for the Merchant Ivory Productions adaptation of E. M. Forster's Howards End (1992). No. 6 served as the exterior of Wickham Place, the London home of the Schlegel sisters, played by Emma Thompson and Helena Bonham Carter. Scenes shot in the square include Helen arriving home, followed across the square by Leonard Bast (Samuel West).

The square had earlier appeared in Mike Todd's Around the World in 80 Days (1956). Its south side is seen in the film, and Cantinflas, as Passepartout, arrives at an employment office filmed at 5 Lower Grosvenor Place, at the north-east corner of the square.

It was used again in Frank Tashlin's The Alphabet Murders (1965), an adaptation of Agatha Christie's The A.B.C. Murders, in which Tony Randall as Hercule Poirot and Robert Morley as Captain Hastings walk into the square from Lower Grosvenor Place.

== Gallery ==
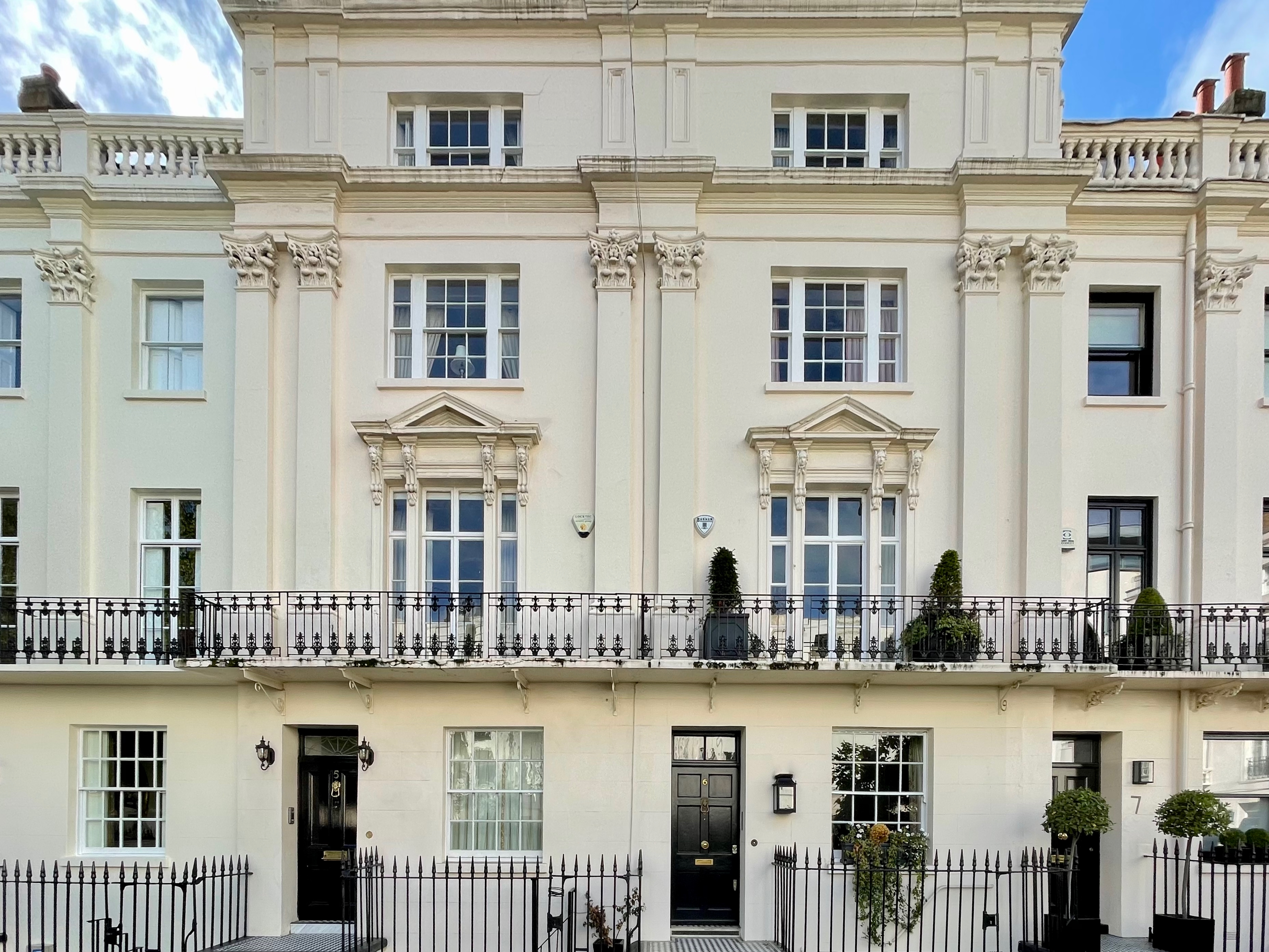
Nos 5–6, the south-side terrace; No. 6 was the Schlegels' house in Howards End

Nos 13–16

No. 8, with the plaque to Thomas Campbell

Nos 22–24

The central garden in 2025

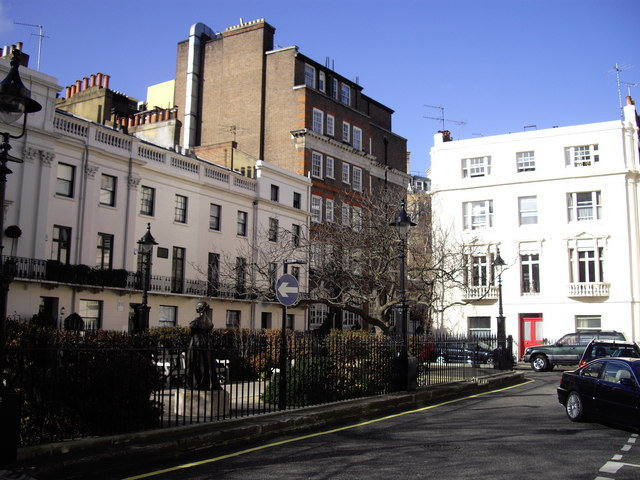
The square in 2009

== Notes and references ==
Footnotes
