= 26 St James's Place =

Apartment building in London, England

Coordinates: 51.5054°N 0.1404°W

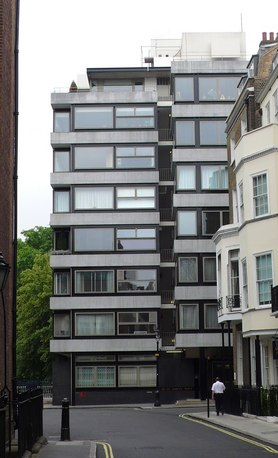
26 St James's Place, London, 2007

26 St James's Place is a grade II* listed block of flats in St James's Place, St James's, London W1.

The block of eight flats was built in 1959–60, and designed by Denys Lasdun and Partners, with Alexander Redhouse as the partner in charge, and Graham Lane, Lyall Anderson and Maya Hambly as assistant architects, and Ove Arup and Partners as the engineers. It is built with reinforced concrete clad with Baveno grey granite and white vitreous mosaic on the soffits.

In 1960, it was awarded the RIBA London Architecture Bronze Medal.

It replaced a house built in about 1692, and destroyed by German bombing in World War II. Notable residents included Sir John Harpur, and Lieutenant-General Sir John Cope, who demolished it in 1745 and built a larger house, where he lived until his death in 1760. Later occupants included Richard Rigby, Richard Vernon, Robert Smith, 1st Baron Carrington, who extended the house, and the Dowager Lady Arden.
