= St James's Place =

Street in the City of Westminster, London, England

Coordinates: 51°30′20.61″N 0°8′22.78″W

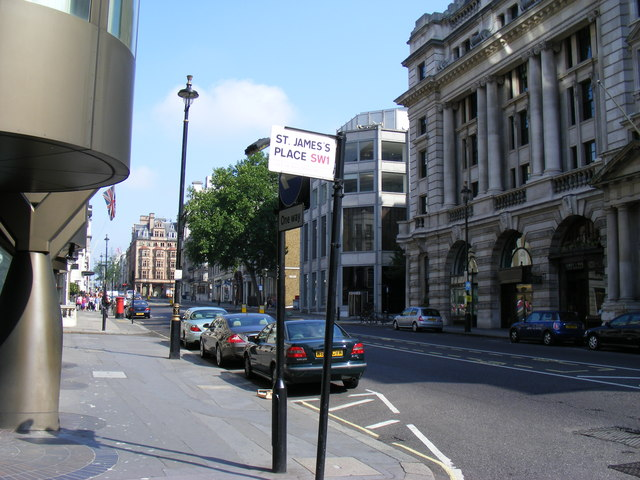
A sign for St James's Place along St James's Street

St James's Place is a street in the St James's district of London near Green Park. It was first developed around 1694, the historian John Strype describing it in 1720 as a "good Street ... which receiveth a fresh Air out of the Park; the Houses are well-built, and inhabited by Gentry ..." Henry Benjamin Wheatley wrote in 1870 that it was "one of the oddest built streets in London."

Spencer House, which was commissioned by the 1st Earl Spencer in 1756, stands at number 27 and is now listed as Grade I. A further thirteen properties are Grade II listed; Number 4 is Grade II* listed.

== Notable residents ==
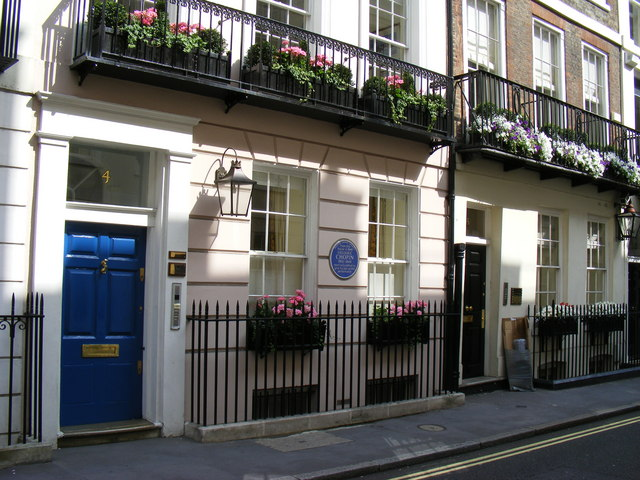
No. 4 St James's Place, from where Frédéric Chopin left for the Guildhall on 16 November 1848 for his last public performance

- Joseph Addison (1672–1719), author and politician who founded The Spectator, lived here in 1710.
- Eustace Budgell (1686–1737), English writer and politician.
- Sir Francis Burdett (1770–1844), reforming politician known as "Old Glory", lived at number 25 from 1820 to 1844.
- Sir Francis Chichester (1901–1972), pioneer aviator, sailor and author, lived at number 9 from 1944 to 1972.
- Lord Randolph Henry Spencer-Churchill (1849–1895), British statesman, lived at number 29 from April 1880 to late 1882.
- James Craggs the Younger (1686–1721), English politician.
- Mary Delany (1700–1788), English artist and writer.
- Captain Basil Hall (1788–1844), Scottish traveller and author, lived at number 4.
- Cornelius Hatfield, Jr. (1755–1823), American Revolutionary War Loyalist partisan captain from Elizabeth, New Jersey.
- John Hick (1815–1894), English industrialist, art collector and Conservative Party politician, lived at number 4.
- Henry Grattan (1746–1820), Irish politician.
- White Kennett (1660–1728), Bishop of Peterborough.
- John Lubbock (1803–1865), English banker and scientist.
- Stafford Northcote, 1st Earl of Iddesleigh (1818–1887), British statesman, lived at number 30.
- Richard Rigby (1722–1788), English civil servant and politician.
- Samuel Rogers (1763–1855), 19th-century English poet.
- Oscar Wilde (1854–1900), Irish playwright, novelist, essayist, and poet, rented rooms at 10–11 for five months in 1893–1894.
- John Wilkes (1725–1797), English journalist and politician, lived there in 1756.

== Gallery ==
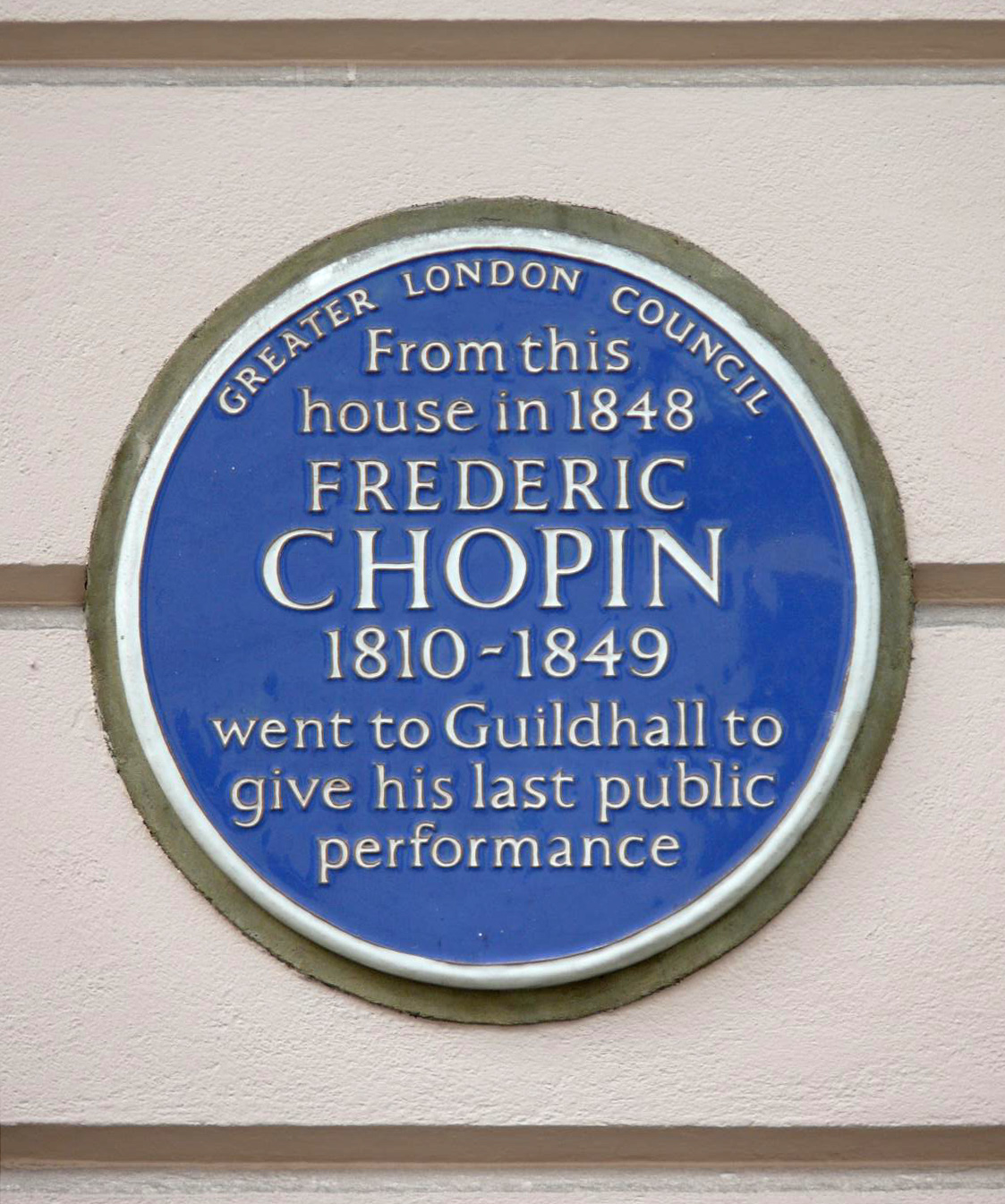
Blue Plaque at 4 St James's Place

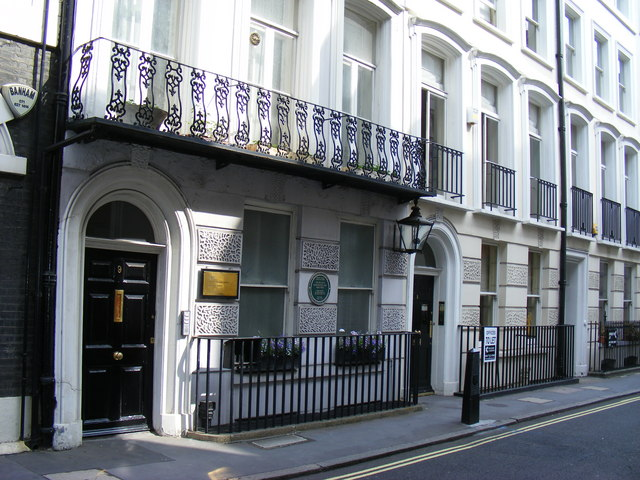
Francis Chichester Map and Guide publishing house at 9 St James's Place

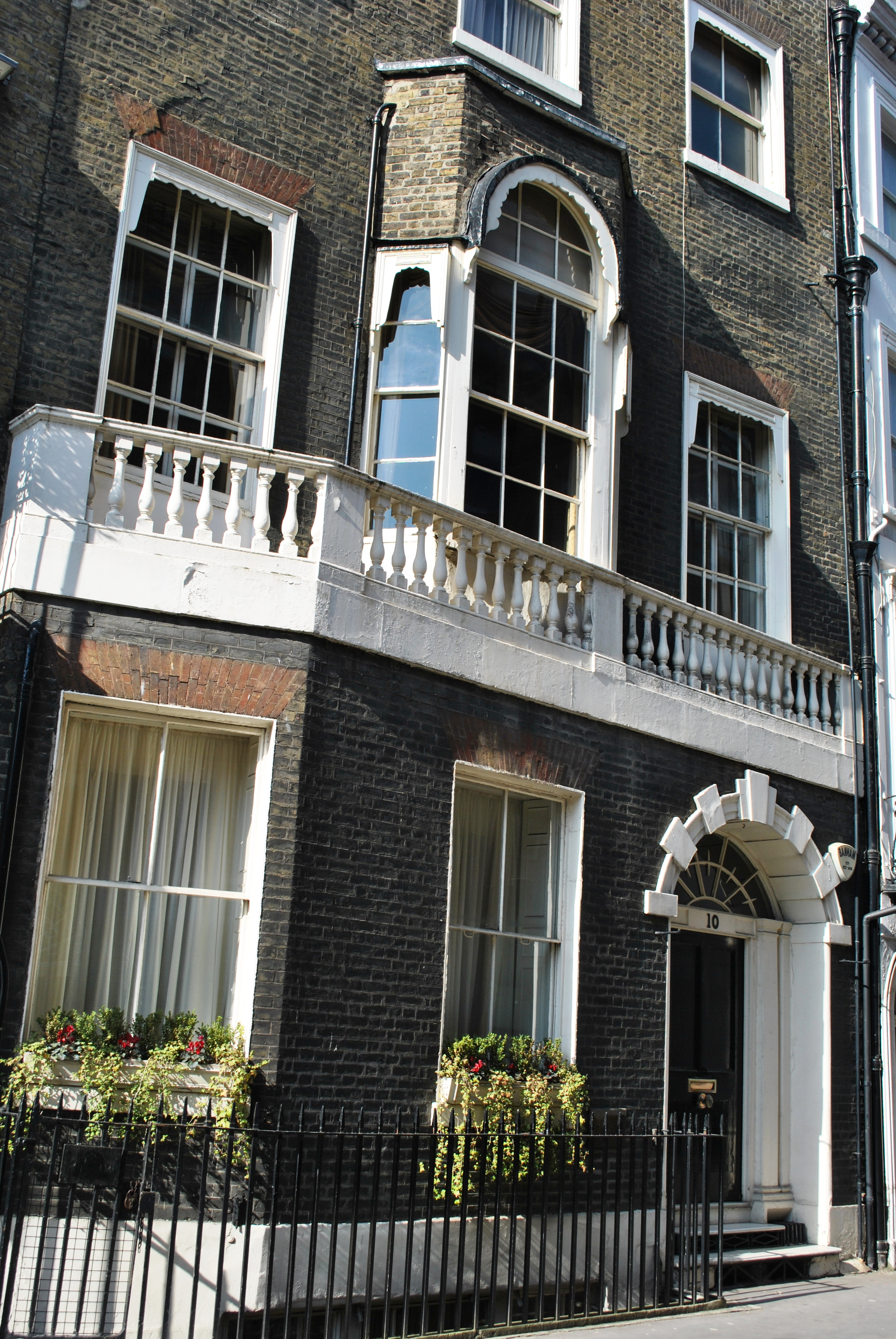
10-11 St James's Place

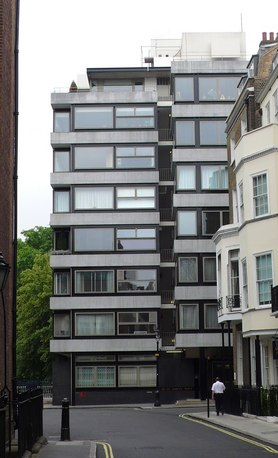
26 St James's Place

== See also ==
- St James's Church, Piccadilly
- St James's Park
- St James's Square
- St James's Street
- The Stafford
