= 115 Harley Street =

Coordinates: 51.5215°N 0.1484°W

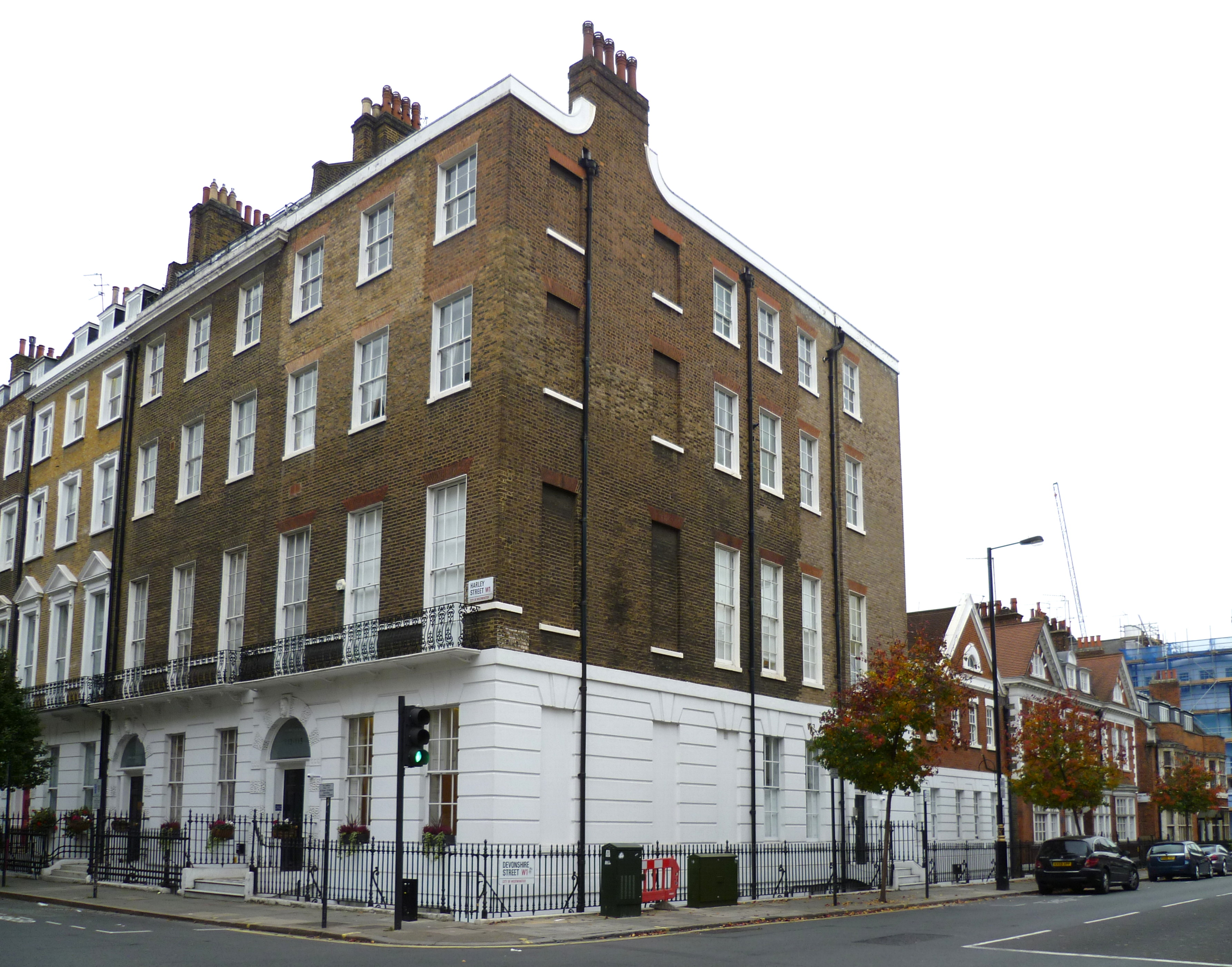
115 Harley Street

115 Harley Street is a grade II* listed terraced town house in Harley Street, in the City of Westminster, London. The house is of the "first rate" class, built around 1777 as part of the Portland Estate (now the Howard de Walden Estate), probably by John White and the plasterer Thomas Collins who were associated with Sir William Chambers.
