= Hazlitt's =

Hotel in Soho, London

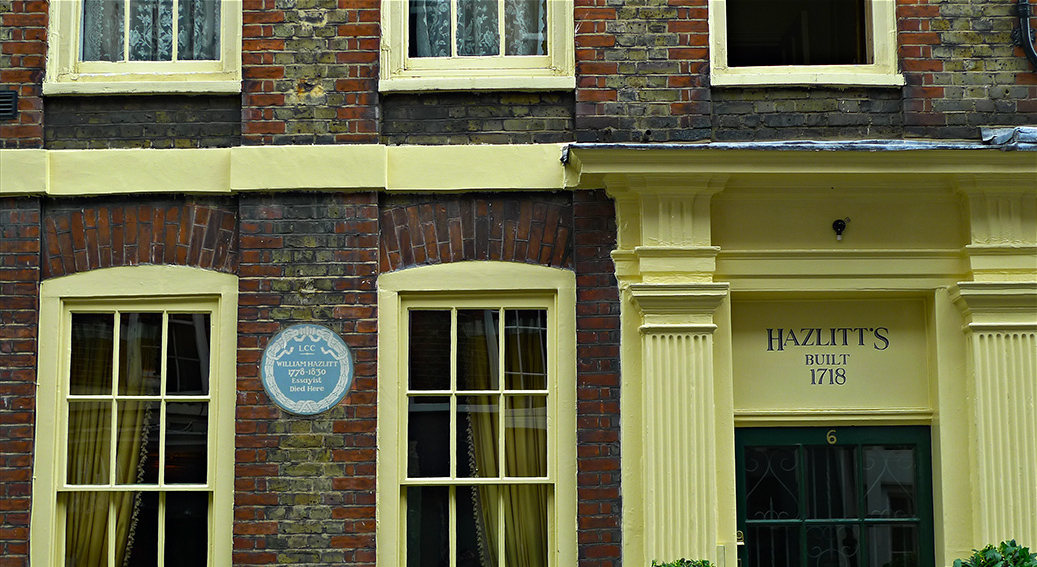

- Location within Central London

General information
- Location: 6 Frith Street, Soho Square, London, England, United Kingdom
- Coordinates: 51°30′51″N 0°7′54″W
- Owner: Peter McKay & Douglas Blain

Technical details
- Floor count: 4

Other information
- Number of rooms: 30
- Number of suites: 1 + 2 junior suites

Website
- www.hazlittshotel.com

Hazlitt's is a townhouse hotel located at 6 Frith Street, Soho, London, in very close proximity to Soho Theatre. The building is Georgian and dates back to 1718, four storeys, with typical long Georgian-bay windows painted in beige. Owned by Peter McKay and Douglas Blain, it is named after the essayist William Hazlitt who died in the house in 1830; he has a blue plaque on the wall to the left of the front door. Due to its heritage, the hotel is popular with writers, but also artists, leaders, actors and models. It was awarded the César Award for London Hotel of the Year by The Good Hotel Guide in 2002.

The hotel has 30 rooms – 3 singles, 24 doubles, 2 junior suites and 1 suite. The rooms are furnished with four poster beds, antiques and old paintings and the bathrooms contain claw-footed baths. The hotel contains over 2,000 paintings and prints. The rooftop of the hotel has been used for photoshoots.
