= St James's Street =

Street in the St James's area of the City of Westminster in London

Coordinates: 51°30′25″N 0°8′23″W

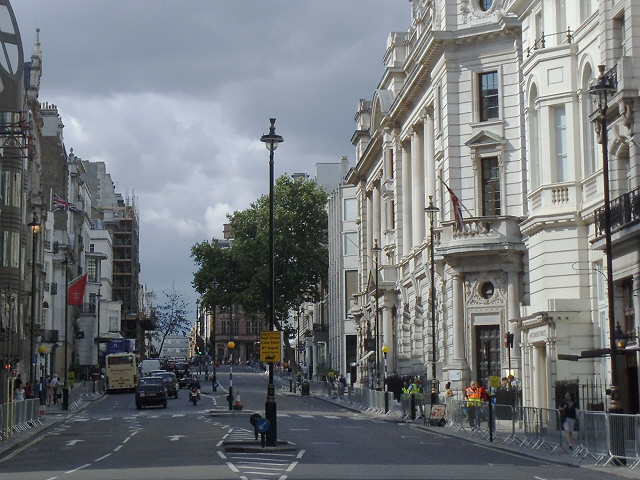
St James's Street, looking up the road toward Piccadilly

St James's Street is the principal road in the district of St James's in central London. It runs from Piccadilly down to Pall Mall and St James's Palace. The main gatehouse of the Palace is at the southern end of the road. In the 17th century, Clarendon House faced down St James's Street across Piccadilly from the site of what is now Albemarle Street.

== History ==
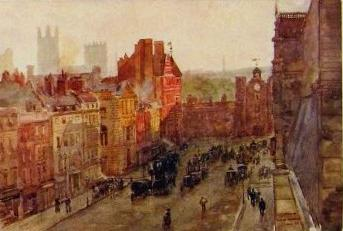
St James's Street and St James's Palace, chromolithograph, about 1890

St James's Street was developed without an overall plan. It received a boost with Lord St Albans' planned construction of harmonious grand town houses at St James's Square. Today St James's Street contains several of London's best-known gentlemen's clubs (such as Boodle's, Brooks's, the Carlton Club and White's), some exclusive shops and various offices. A series of small side streets on its western side lead to some significant properties overlooking Green Park, including Spencer House and the Royal Over-Seas League at the end of Park Place.

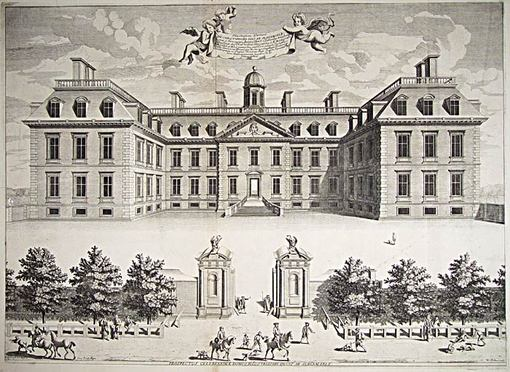
View of Clarendon House, now demolished, which used to face south down St James's Street

Two 18th-century yards survive behind the noble frontages of the street. One is Blue Ball Yard, with stables built in 1742. The other is Pickering Place, with four informal Georgian brick houses of 1731. Jermyn Street, noted for its shirtmakers and associated shops, leads off St James's Street to the east.

From 1711 to 1843 the Thatched House Tavern, notable for its political meetings, was located in the street.

== Access ==
The nearest tube station is Green Park, which stands on Piccadilly, to the west.

== Cultural references ==
St James's Street is referenced in T. S. Eliot's "Bustopher Jones: The Cat About Town" from Old Possum's Book of Practical Cats, wherein Bustopher Jones, a parody of an Edwardian gentleman of leisure, is described as "the St. James's Street Cat".

St James's Street was later featured as the new location for the fictional headquarters of the Kingsman Secret Service in the 2017 film Kingsman: The Golden Circle.

== See also ==
- St James's Church, Piccadilly (to the east)
- St James's Park (to the south)
- St James's Place (to the west)
- St James's Square (to the east)
