= 11–12 North Audley Street =

Listed building in London, England

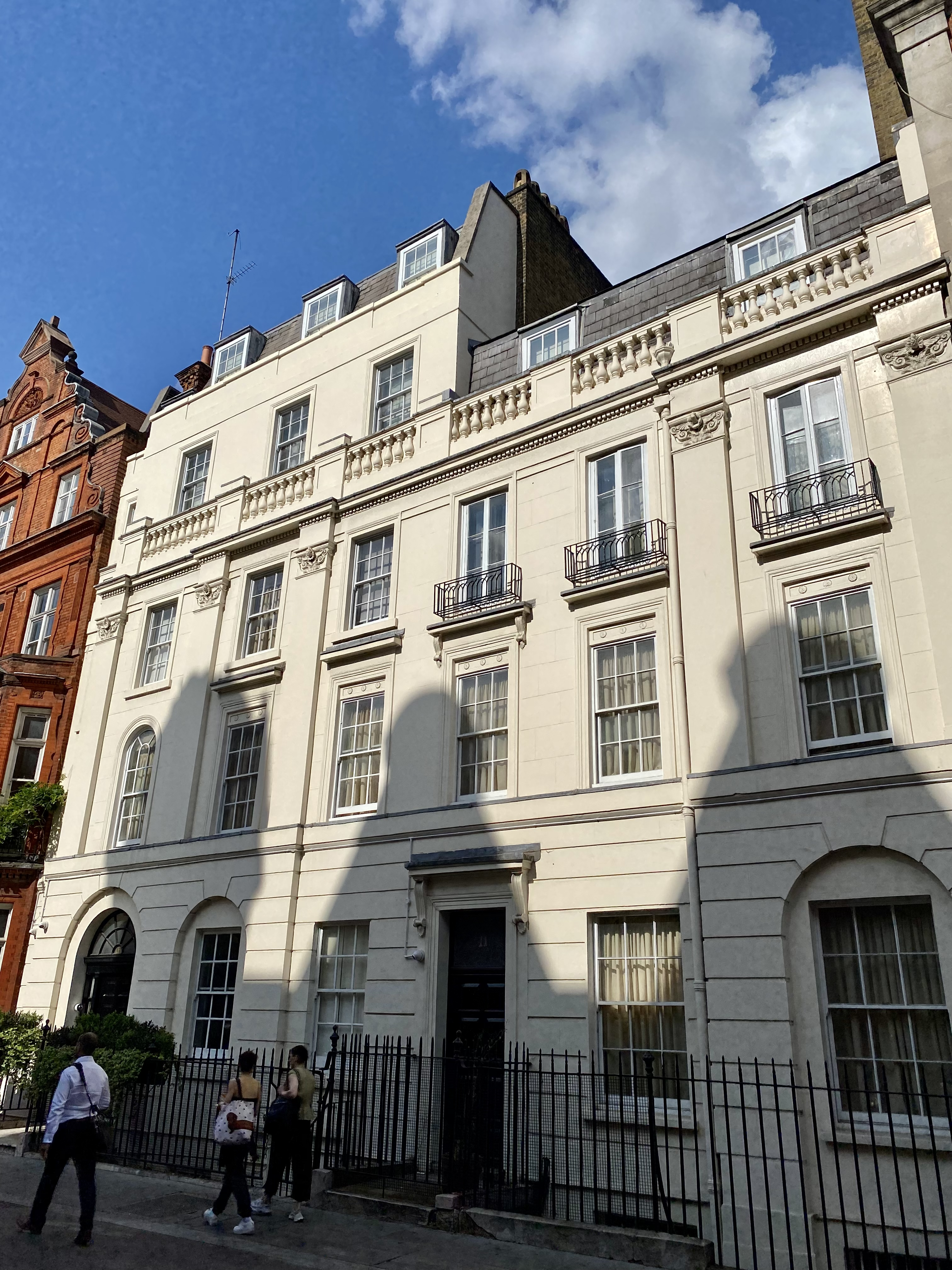
- Interactive map of the 11–12 North Audley Street area

General information
- Type: Residential
- Location: London, England
- Coordinates: 51°30′46″N 0°09′11″W
- Completed: 1730

Design and construction
- Architect: Edward Shepherd

Listed Building – Grade II*
- Official name: 11 AND 12, NORTH AUDLEY STREET W1
- Designated: 24 February 1958
- Reference no.: 1225300

11–12 North Audley Street is a Grade II* listed building on North Audley Street in Mayfair, London.

== History and description ==
Built between 1726 and 1730, it was originally designed by Edward Shepherd alongside the development of the rest of the east side of North Audley Street. It is the only original surviving house on the street, and a short distance from Grade I listed St Mark's Mayfair built in the early 1800s.

No. 12, the larger of the two houses, originally included extensive gardens and stables. It includes its surviving original Georgian interiors, usually attributed to Edward Lovett Pearce, which are considered among the best surviving examples of their kind in London. The interiors were done for Jean Louis Ligonier, a Huguenot refugee and later Commander-in-Chief of the Army, who lived at the house. He purchased No. 11 in 1744, combining the houses. It was occupied by the Gillow family of furniture makers from the 1790s. They installed workshops on the ground floor and operated there until a fire in 1813, with the house being let to various occupants from 1815 including architect James Hakewill.

The facades were remodelled in 1819 for Viscount Ebrington by Thomas Lee, and by 1835 the properties had been redivided by Wright Ingle. No. 12 was extended in 1889. The redevelopment of the street in the late 19th and early 20th centuries saw a threat to the house, but both were preserved, No. 12 for its fine interior and No. 11 for its association with the former.

No. 12's upper floor has a "Chinese" bedroom decorated in the 1930s by Charles Allom for Samuel Courtauld including with work by Rex Whistler. A bathroom was also designed by Piero Malacrida de Saint-August.
