= Lord North Street =

Street in Westminster, London

Coordinates: 51.4965°N 0.1271°W

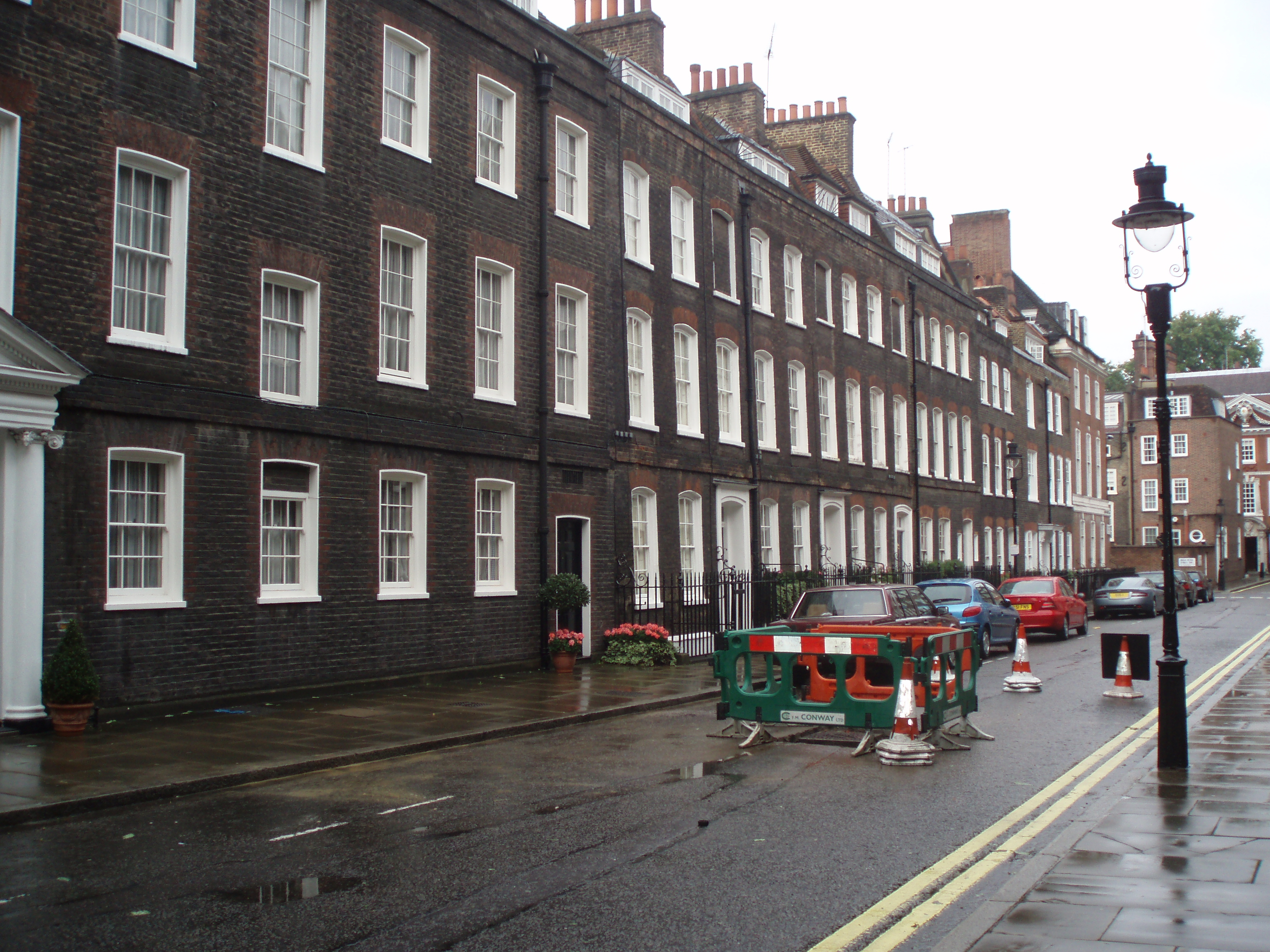
Looking from Smith Square

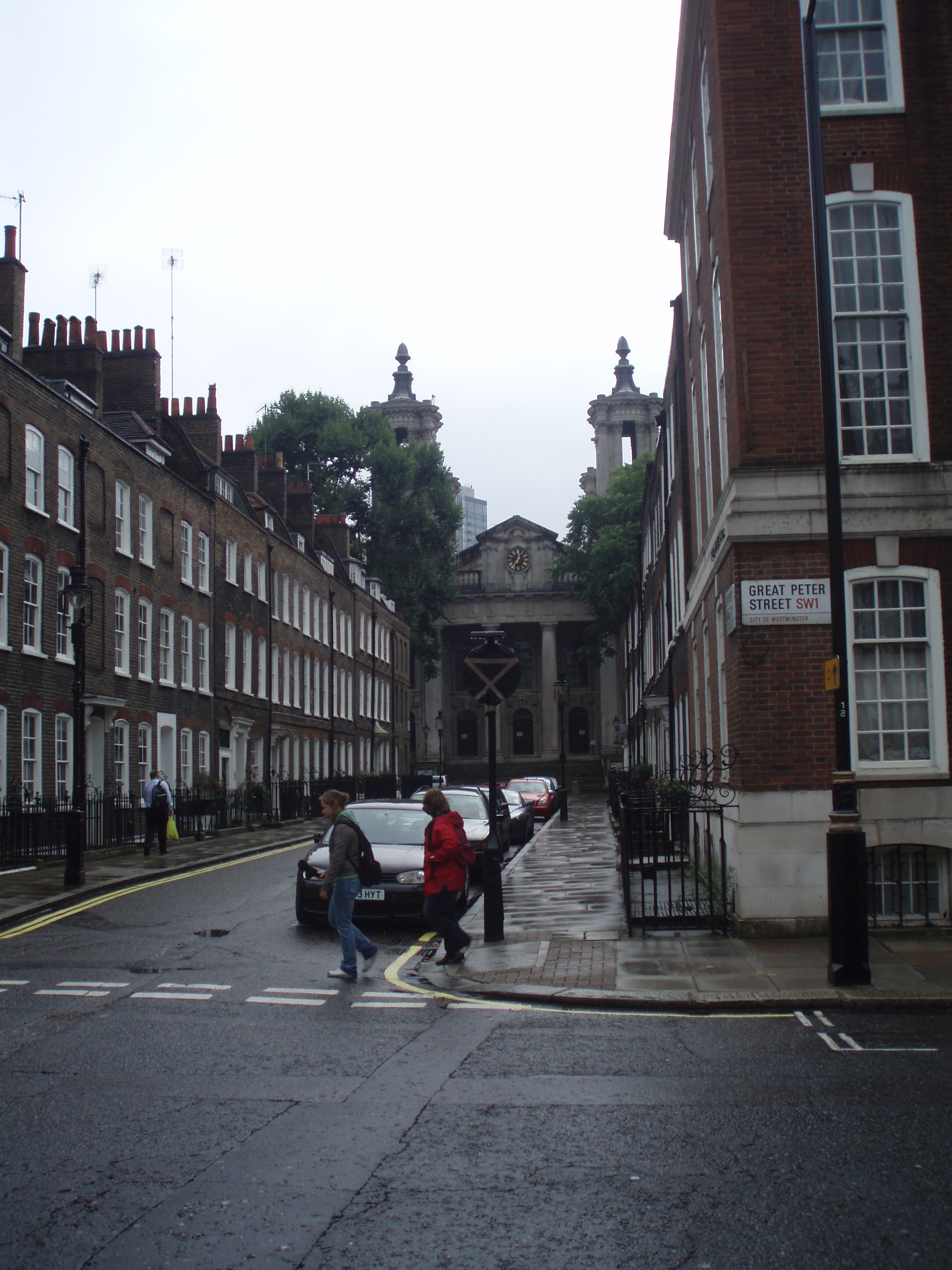
Looking from Great Peter Street

Lord North Street in central London is a short street dating from 1722 of Georgian terraced housing running between Smith Square and Great Peter Street in Westminster, the political heartland of British government. As such the properties have always commanded high fees and featured in many dramatic storylines.

Past residents include the English man of letters Maurice Baring (at North Cottage, No 6, North Street), socialite Sibyl Colefax, founder of the Colefax and Fowler fabrics and wallpaper company, and Harold Wilson, twice Prime Minister who in November 1974 alleged that renegade MI5 operatives had broken into his home.

More recent residents include Jonathan Aitken and Theresa Gorman.

== Origin of name ==
The street was originally North Street (leading north from Smith Square). However, in 1936 Brendan Bracken, a resident and close confidant of Winston Churchill, had it renamed Lord North Street after Frederick North, Lord North, the Prime Minister from 1770 to 1782, as it sounded grander.
