= Henry Vigne =

English cricketer and clergyman

Henry Goldsmith Vigne (1817 – 20 June 1898) was an English cricketer and clergyman.

== Life ==
He was born in London and educated at Peterhouse, Cambridge, being admitted in 1834, graduating B.A. 1838, M.A. 1844. He was ordained deacon in 1840 and priest in 1841, by Philip Shuttleworth the Bishop of Chichester. Admitted to Peterhouse as Henry Goldsmith, he used the surname Vigne by 1841, when he was ordained as Henry Goldsmith Vigne.

Vigne was Vicar of Sunbury-on-Thames in Middlesex from 1842 to 1898. Samuel Sanders Teulon remodelled the Church of St Mary the Virgin, Sunbury-on-Thames for Vigne in the mid-1850s, and Vigne invited members of the Ecclesiological Society, to which he belonged, to visit in 1858. Nikolaus Pevsner wrote of Teulon's work there "The effects of his steamroller sensibility are here particularly revolting."

Chancel, St Mary the Virgin, Sunbury-on-Thames

Vigne died at the vicarage in Sunbury-on-Thames on 20 June 1898, and was buried in Sunbury Old Cemetery.

== Cricket ==
A batsman for the Marylebone Cricket Club across four first-class games between 1837 and 1838, Vigne spent the rest of his playing career in club cricket for St John's Wood and Wanstead.

== Family ==
On 21 November 1842 the Rev. Henry Vigne, then of Nuthurst, married Anne Hodgson, third daughter of Christopher Hodgson. She died on 11 September 1873. His father-in-law was chapter clerk at St Paul's Cathedral, and he owed his preferment to Sunbury to Christopher Hodgson.

The couple's elder daughter Caroline married in 1866 Nevile Reid (born 1839) of Shandwick (see Andrew Reid (brewer)).
