= St John the Baptist's Church, Burringham =

Coordinates: 53.5713°N 0.7441°W

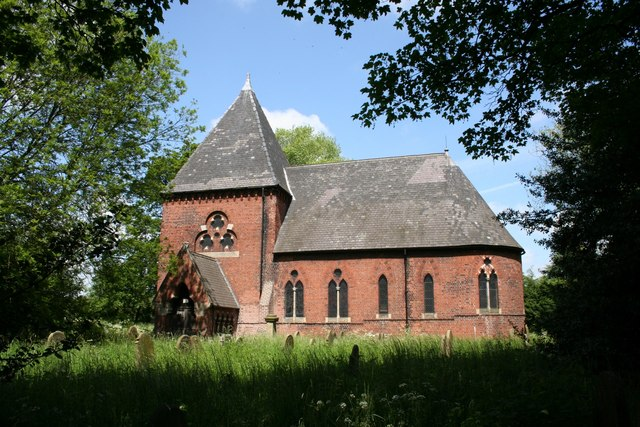
- St John the Baptist's Church, Burringham, from the southeast

- Location in Lincolnshire
- OS grid reference: SE 833 090
- Location: Burringham, Lincolnshire
- Country: England
- Denomination: Anglican
- Website: Churches Conservation Trust

History
- Dedication: Saint John the Baptist

Architecture
- Functional status: Redundant
- Heritage designation: Grade II
- Designated: 7 March 1985
- Architect: S. S. Teulon
- Architectural type: Church
- Style: Gothic Revival
- Groundbreaking: 1856
- Completed: 1857
- Closed: 1983

Specifications
- Materials: Brick with limestone details Roofs slated

St John the Baptist's Church is a redundant Anglican church in the village of Burringham, Lincolnshire, England. It is recorded in the National Heritage List for England as a designated Grade II listed building, and is under the care of the Churches Conservation Trust. The church stands at the south end of the village, on the east bank of the River Trent.

== History ==
The church was built in 1856–57 to a design by S. S. Teulon. It closed in 1983, and was declared redundant the following year.

== Architecture ==
=== Exterior ===
St John's is constructed in red brick with English bond brickwork. The details are in black brick and limestone ashlar. The roofs of the body of the church are slated, and the porch has a concrete tile roof. Its plan consists of a five-bay nave, a chancel with an apse and an organ chamber and vestry on the north side, and a west tower incorporating a porch. The tower is short, and has buttresses at its junction with the nave, and a stair turret at the northwest angle. It has a two-light north window, and a similar but larger three-light west window. Above the porch is a trefoil containing three blocked trefoils and a roundel in the centre. There is a brick frieze under the eaves, and on the summit of the tower is a pyramidal roof with a pinnacle. The south porch has buttresses flanking a trefoil-headed doorway, and a four-bay blind arcade on each side. On the sides of the nave are two-light windows. The chancel has lancet windows, and three two-light windows in the apse. At the eastern end of the roof is a pinnacle.

=== Interior ===
The interior of the church is decorated in polychrome brick, in red, yellow and black. It is floored with polychrome encaustic tiles. The font is octagonal, with coloured encaustic tiled panels. There is 19th-century stained glass in the south and east windows. The ceiling above the altar is painted with stars and constellations. The organ had been made in 1849 by Forster and Andrews for St Andrew's Church, Epworth. It was moved here and restored at an unknown date by T. L. Jubb and Son.

== External features ==
The churchyard extension contains the war graves of two soldiers of the Second World War.

== See also ==
- List of churches preserved by the Churches Conservation Trust in the East of England
