= Pond Street, Hampstead =

Street in London, England

Coordinates: 51.55386°N 0.16687°W

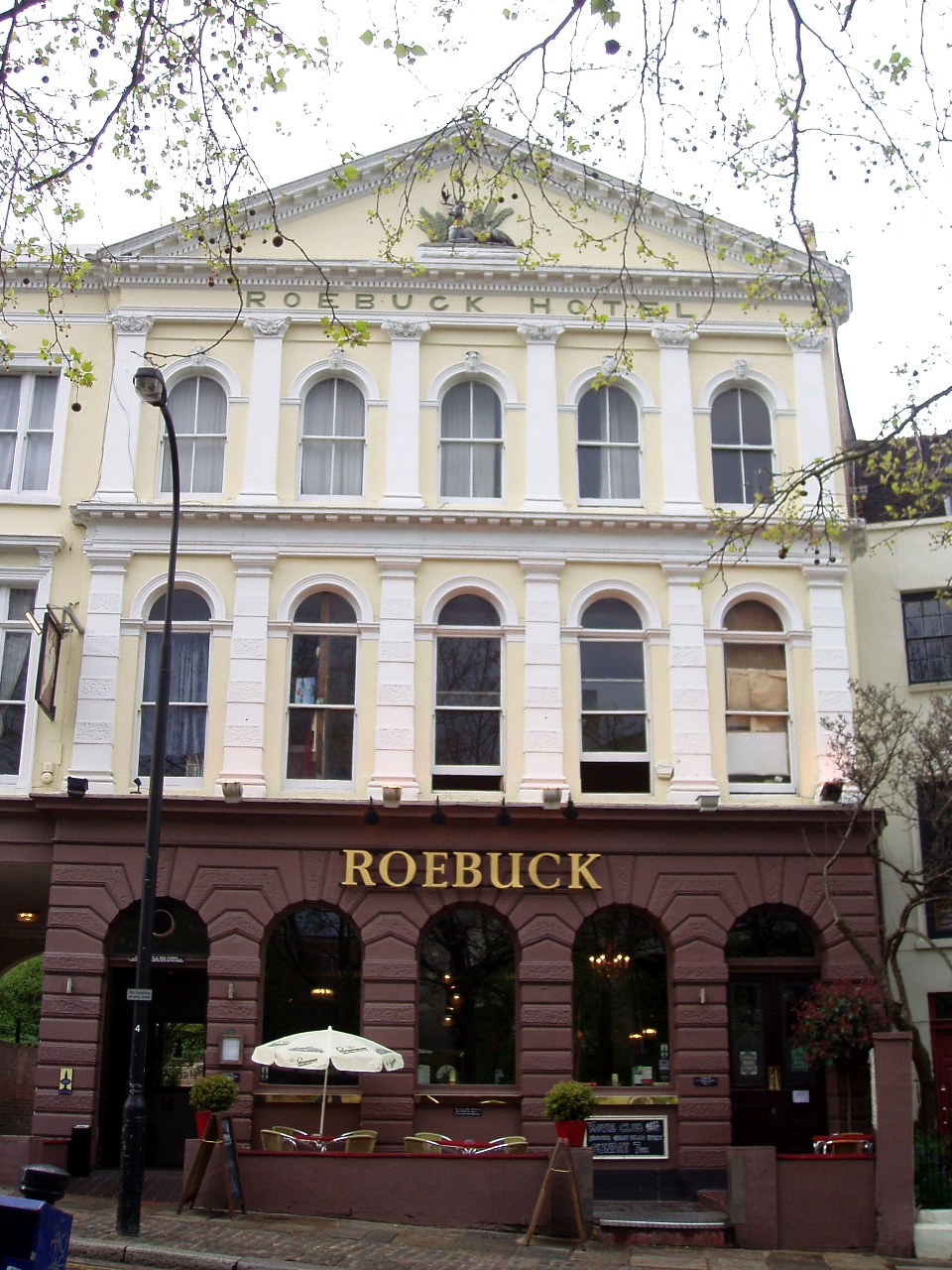
The Roebuck Hotel.

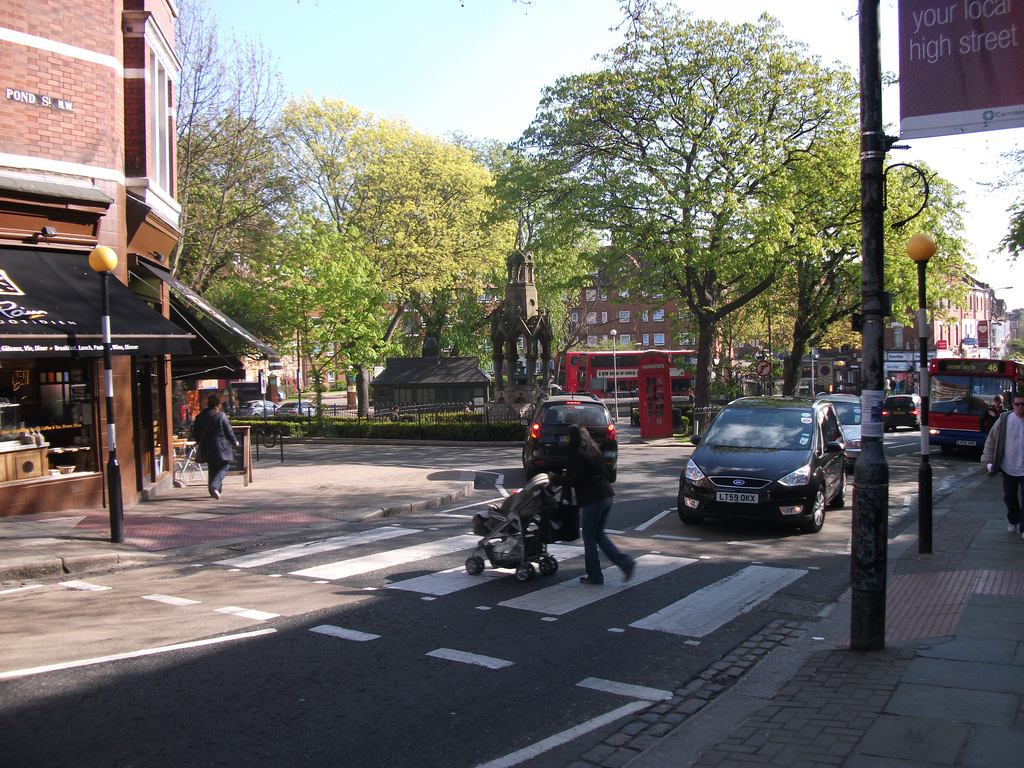
South End Green. The eastern end of Pond Street.

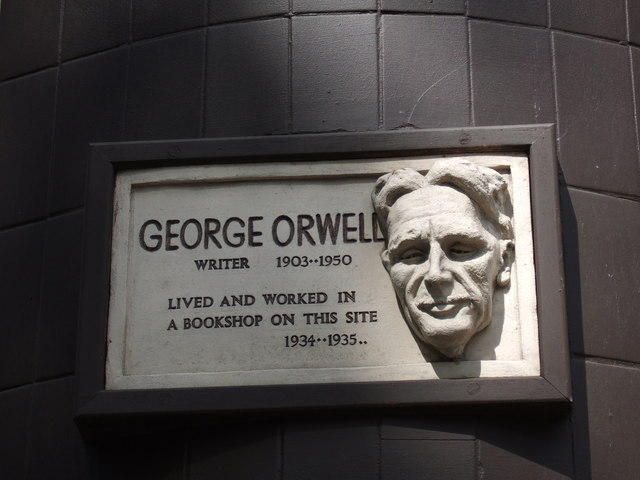
Memorial to the writer George Orwell.

Pond Street is located in Hampstead in the London Borough of Camden. It runs eastwards from Rosslyn Hill to South End Green, located in the old "South End" of the settlement. The street takes its name from an ancient pond at South End Green, a source of the River Fleet, and has been known by this name since at least 1678. The pond survived into the Victorian era.

At the western end is St Stephen's, a former church designed in Gothic Revival style by Samuel Sanders Teulon around 1870. What remains of the once larger Hampstead Green is nearby. Hampstead Hill Gardens heads off northwards from Pond Street. The Roebuck Hotel, on the northern side, dates from the late 1860s. The Royal Free Hospital, built in the 1970s, is on the southern side of the street.

The closest railway station is Hampstead Heath railway station in adjacent South End Road. Opened in 1860 on the North London Line, it is the oldest station in the area. Many of the buildings in Pond Street are now listed, including a number of stucco designs from the 1860s. Notable residents have included the author Wilkie Collins and the zoologist Julian Huxley, while George Orwell worked in a bookshop which is commemorated with a plaque. Rowland Hill, the founder of the penny post, has a blue plaque at the Royal Free Hospital.

== Bibliography ==
- Bebbington, Gillian. London Street Names. Batsford, 1972.
- Cherry, Bridget & Pevsner, Nikolaus. London 4: North. Yale University Press, 2002.
- Wade, Christopher. The Streets of Hampstead. Camden History Society, 2000.
