= Hunstanworth =

Village in County Durham, England

Coordinates: 54°50′N 2°04′W

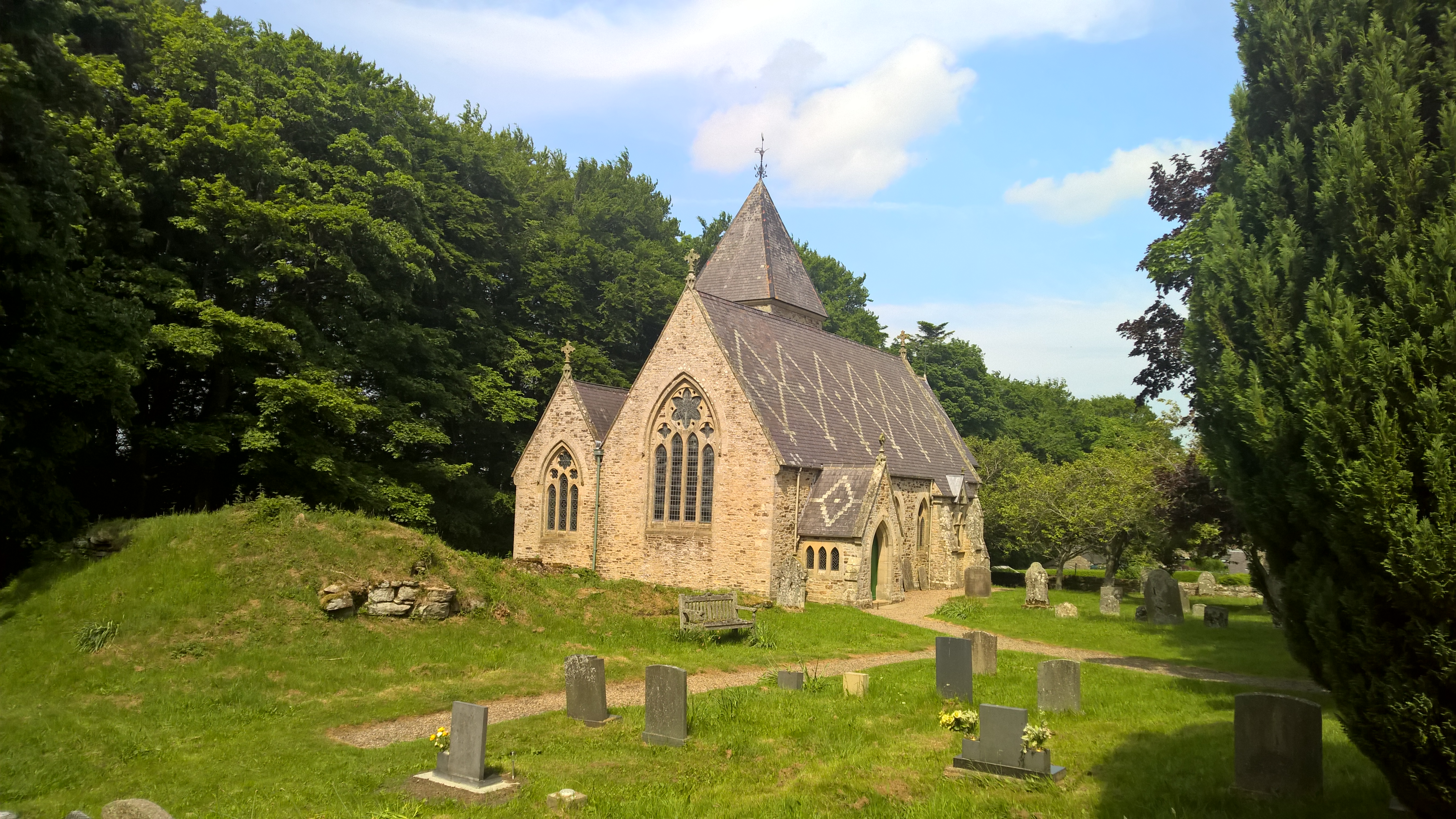
Parish church viewed from the west. The ruins of a 16th-century pele tower can be seen to the left.

Hunstanworth is a village in County Durham, England. It is situated approximately 10 miles to the west of Consett, south-west of the village of Blanchland. The population of the village as taken at the 2011 Census was 116.

Listed in the Boldon Book (1183), “Robert Corbet held Hunstanworth by forest service, as is expressed in his charter of inheritance”. Other nearby lands where held by the Hospital of St Giles at Kepier to which Corbet settled his whole estate. The Hospital held the lands until the dissolution when they were passed to William Paget.

The church, dedicated to St James the Less, was built in 1781 on a medieval site. The village was designed and built around the original parish church. The Reverend Daniel Capper commissioned architect Samuel Sanders Teulon to create the village in 1862-3; as well as rebuilding the church, Teulon delivered a vicarage and stable block, school and school-house and a mix of terraced, semi-detached and detached houses, all constructed of sandstone.

There are the ruins of a pele or tower house in the grounds of the church roughly dated to the 15th or 16th century.

Hunstanworth is one of the Thankful Villages that suffered no fatalities during the Great War of 1914–1918. There is a carved alabaster panel on the west wall of the parish church in low relief, 'We thank thee/LORD/for bringing back/our soldiers/safely home/1914-1918'. The village is featured on Darren Hayman's album, Thankful Villages Volume 3.

The nearby hamlet of Allanshields is listed in documentation from 1338, "John de Alaynsheles held a messuage and a hundred acres of arable and meadow ground in Alaynsheles".
