= St Mary's Church, Ealing =

St Mary's Church
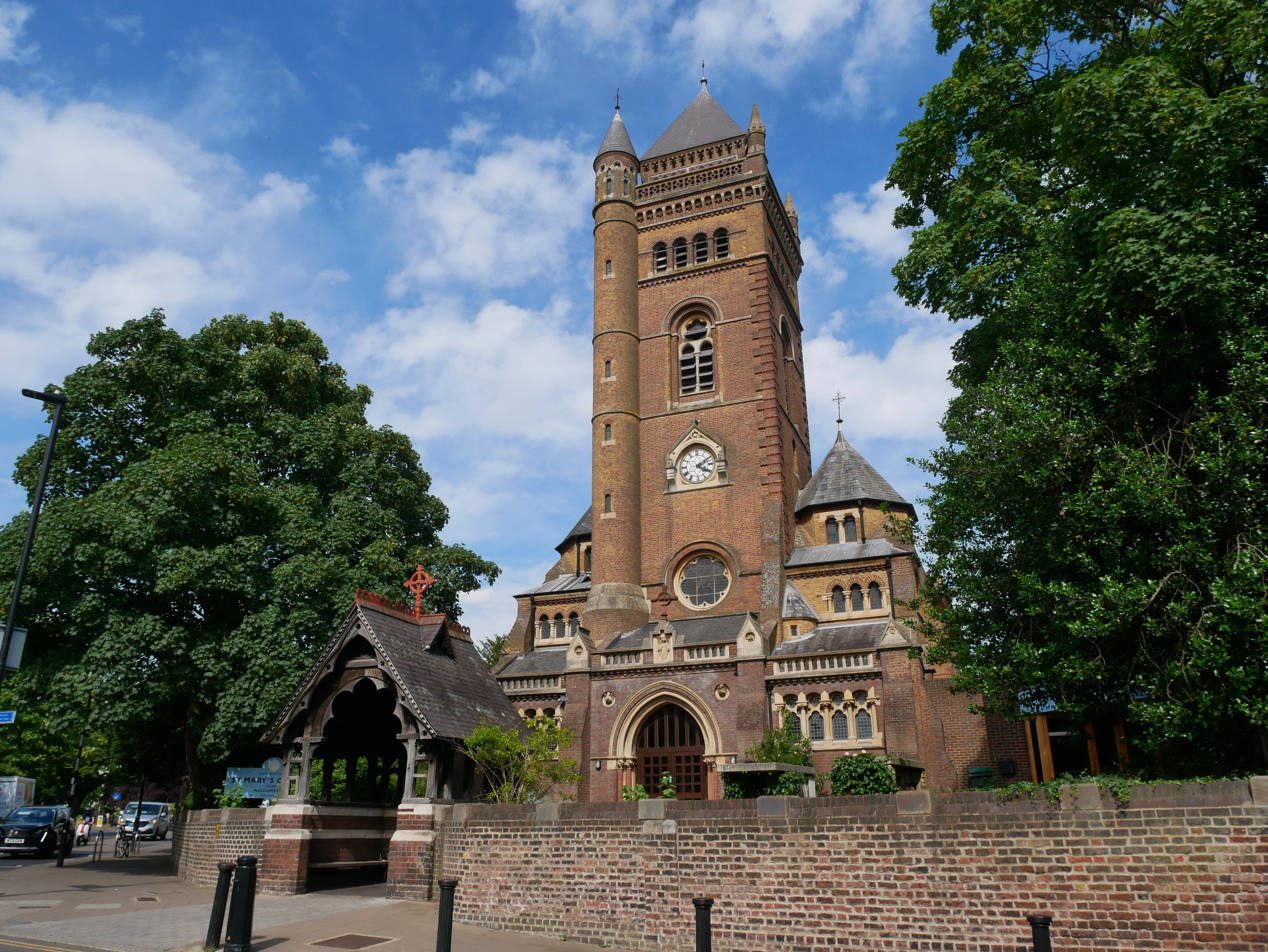
- West face of St Mary's Church, South Ealing

- St Mary's in London
- 51.5043446°N 0.3057416°W
- Country: England
- Denomination: Church of England
- Website: stmarysealing.org.uk

History
- Status: Parish church
- Consecrated: 1866

Architecture
- Functional status: Active
- Heritage designation: Grade II
- Designated: 19 Jan 1981
- Architect: Samuel Sanders Teulon
- Style: Romanesque
- Years built: 1865-1873

Administration
- Province: Canterbury
- Diocese: London
- Archdeaconry: Northolt
- Deanery: Ealing
- Parish: Ealing St Mary

Clergy
- Vicar: Steve Paynter

St Mary's Church, Ealing, St Mary's Road, Ealing, England, W5 5RH. The building is listed as Grade II, Number: 1079376.

Outside the building is Romanesque. The old medieval church was demolished in 1720 and a new church opened in 1740, design by James Horne. The current church was designed by the architect S.S.Teulon, who enlarged and redecorated the earlier Georgian church, between 1865 and 1873, giving it the outer appearance of a Greek Byzantine basilica. The interior is a virtuous adaption of medieval (Gothic rather than Romanesque) elements in industrial age cast iron. The new building was consecrated in 1866 by Bishop Tait, the Bishop of London, who praised Teulon's alterations at St Mary's, Ealing, as "the transformation of a Georgian monstrosity into the semblance of a Byzantine Basilica".

A vestry was added in 1887, the organ enlarged in 1927, further redecoration in the 1950s and 'The Polygon' created in 1978. Further restoration was completed in 2003.

The church contains a good collection of Victorian stained glass windows that were commissioned by Thomas Boddington, who lived at Gunnersbury Lodge, in 1864–74. Old wall tablets and a medieval brass to Richard and Kateryn Amondesham (c.1490) were retained from the old church.

The marble and Caen stone reredos was adorned with Salviati mosaics.

There is a memorial to John Horne Tooke (d 1812) by Louis Frederick Roslyn and a modern brass to Walrond Jackson, Bishop of Antigua, who died in Ealing in 1895.

== Gallery ==
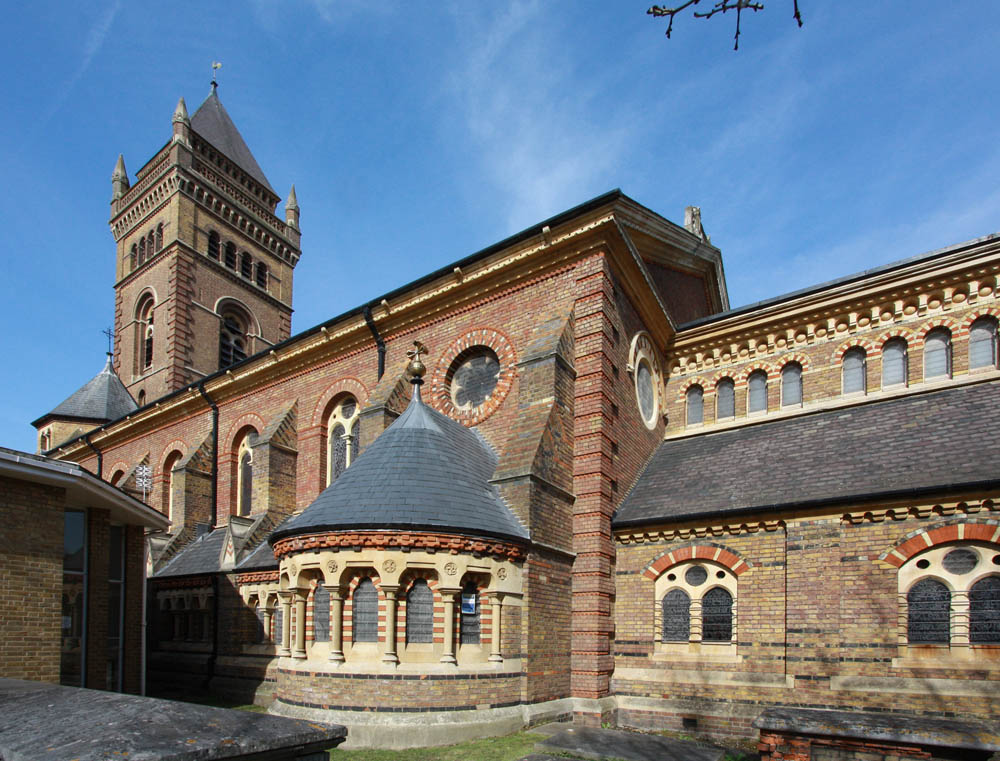
Nave & chancel from the south east

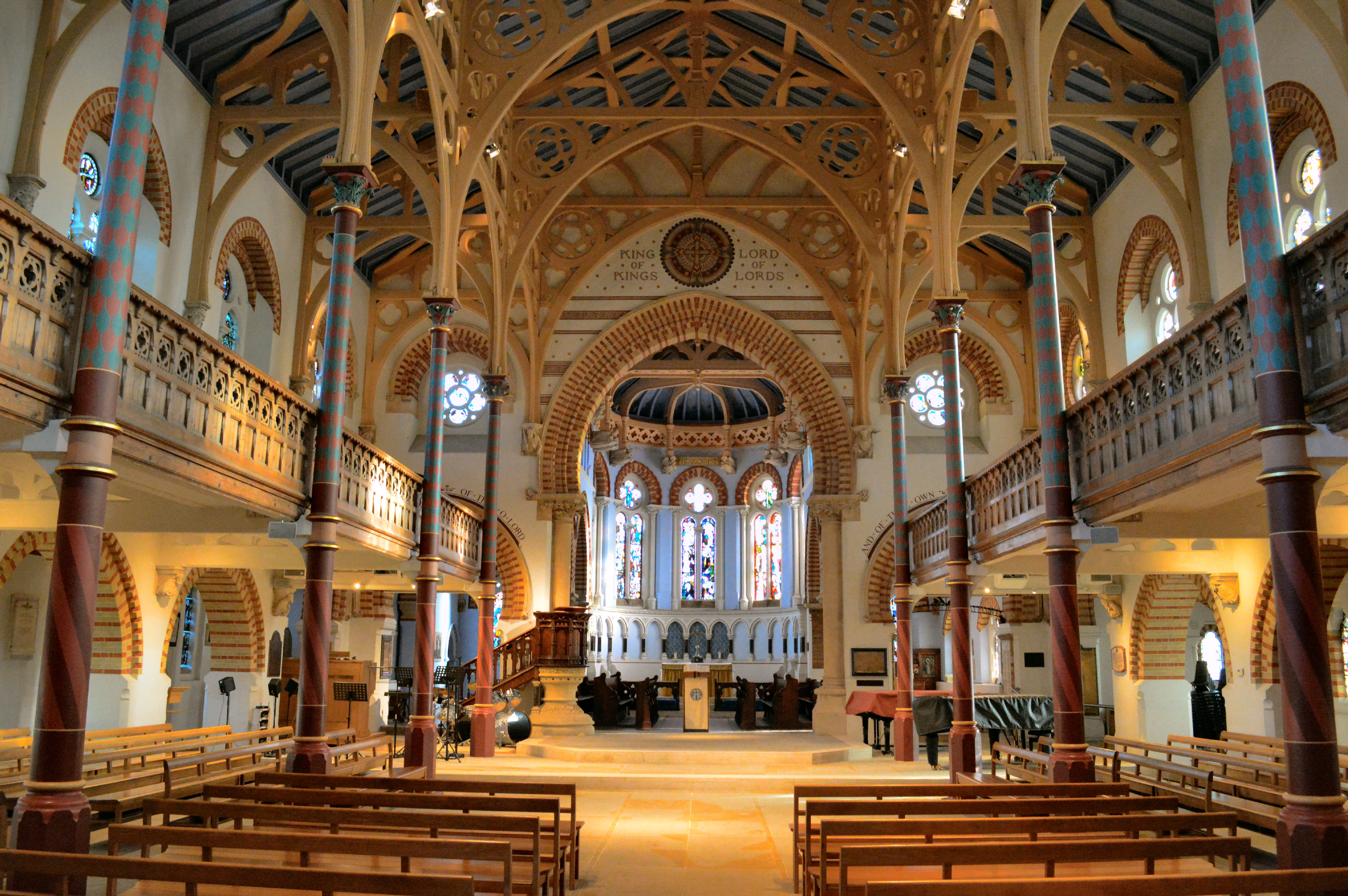
Nave eastward, transparent iron vaults

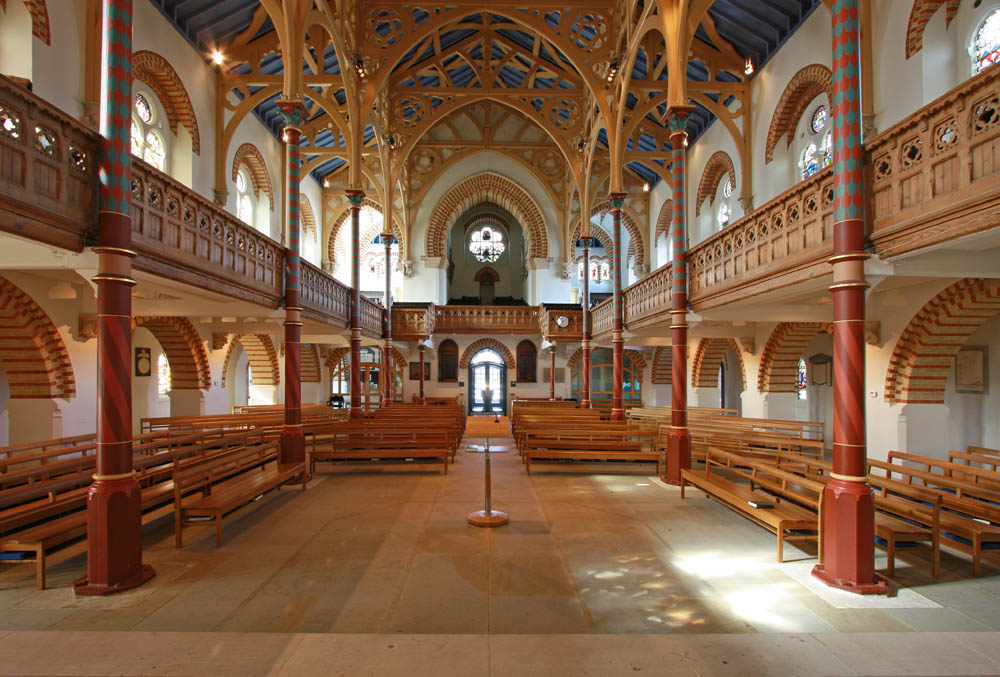
Nave westward

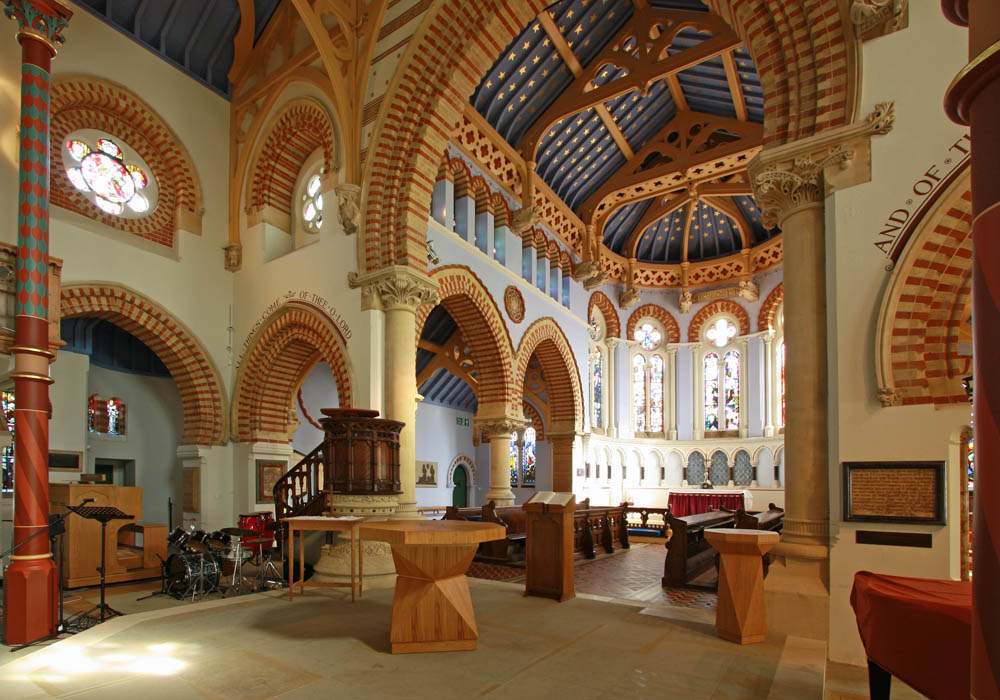
Chancel

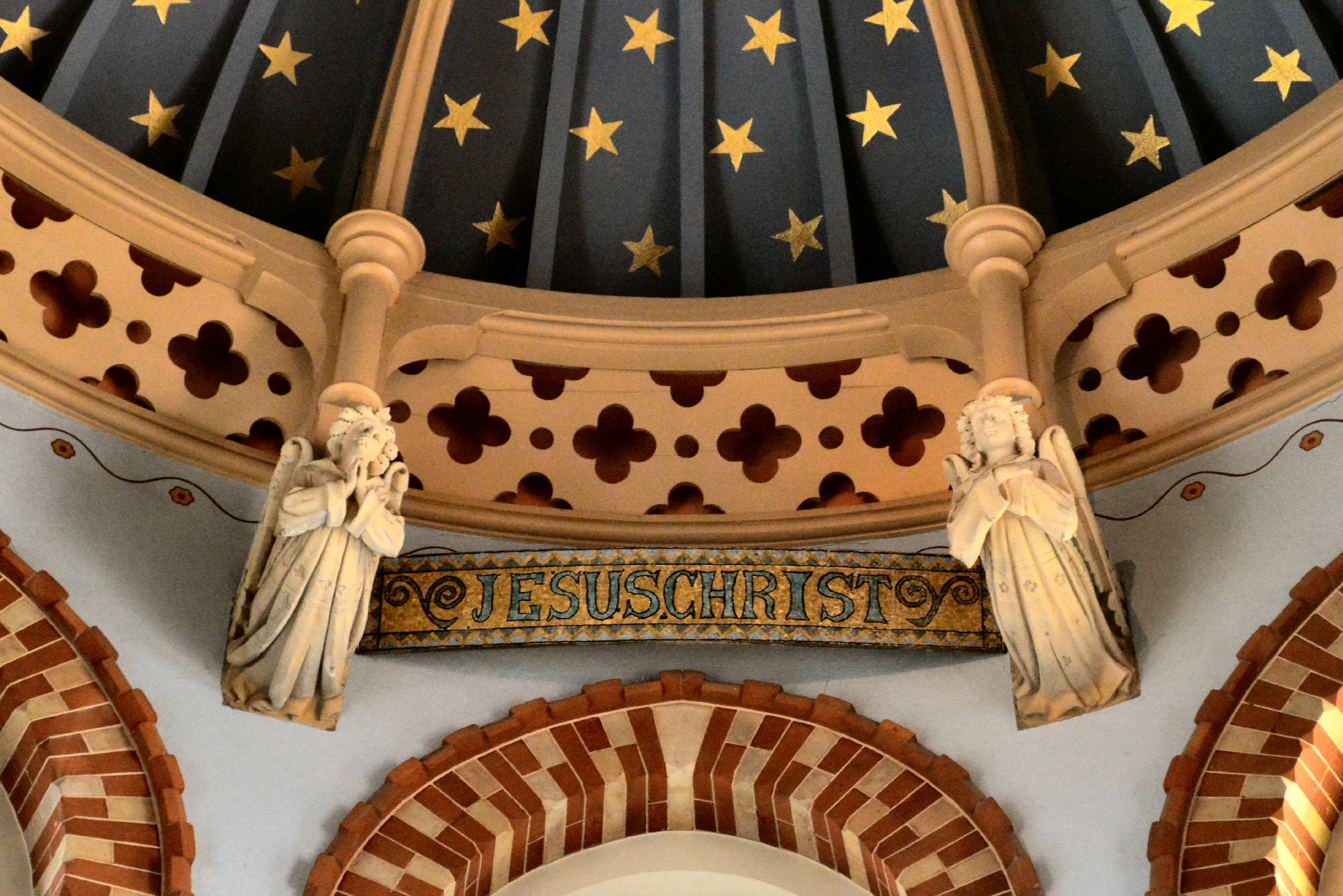
Angels in the apse

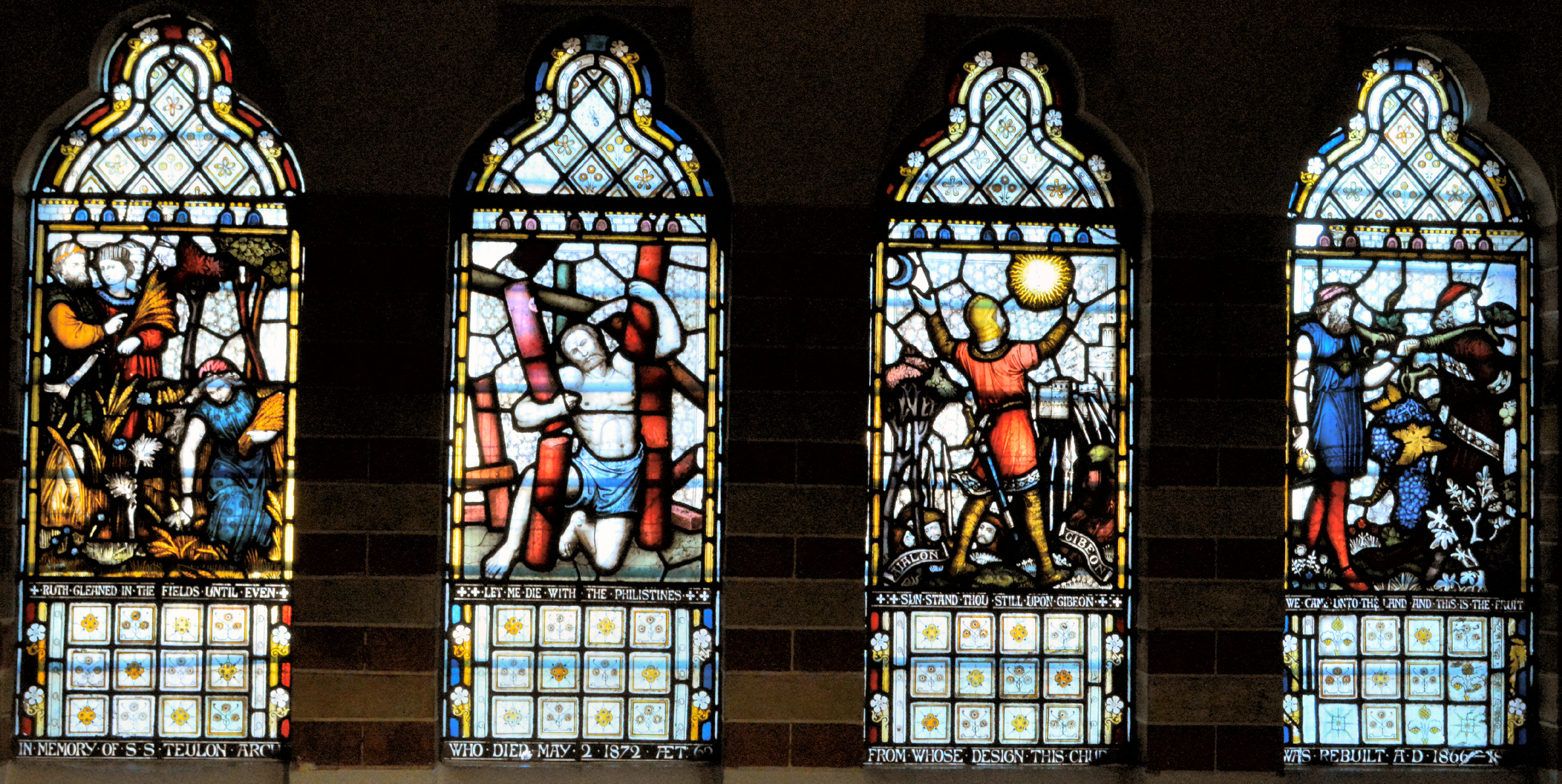
Stained-glass

== See also ==
- Jill Saward
