= St James' Church, Edgbaston =

St James'
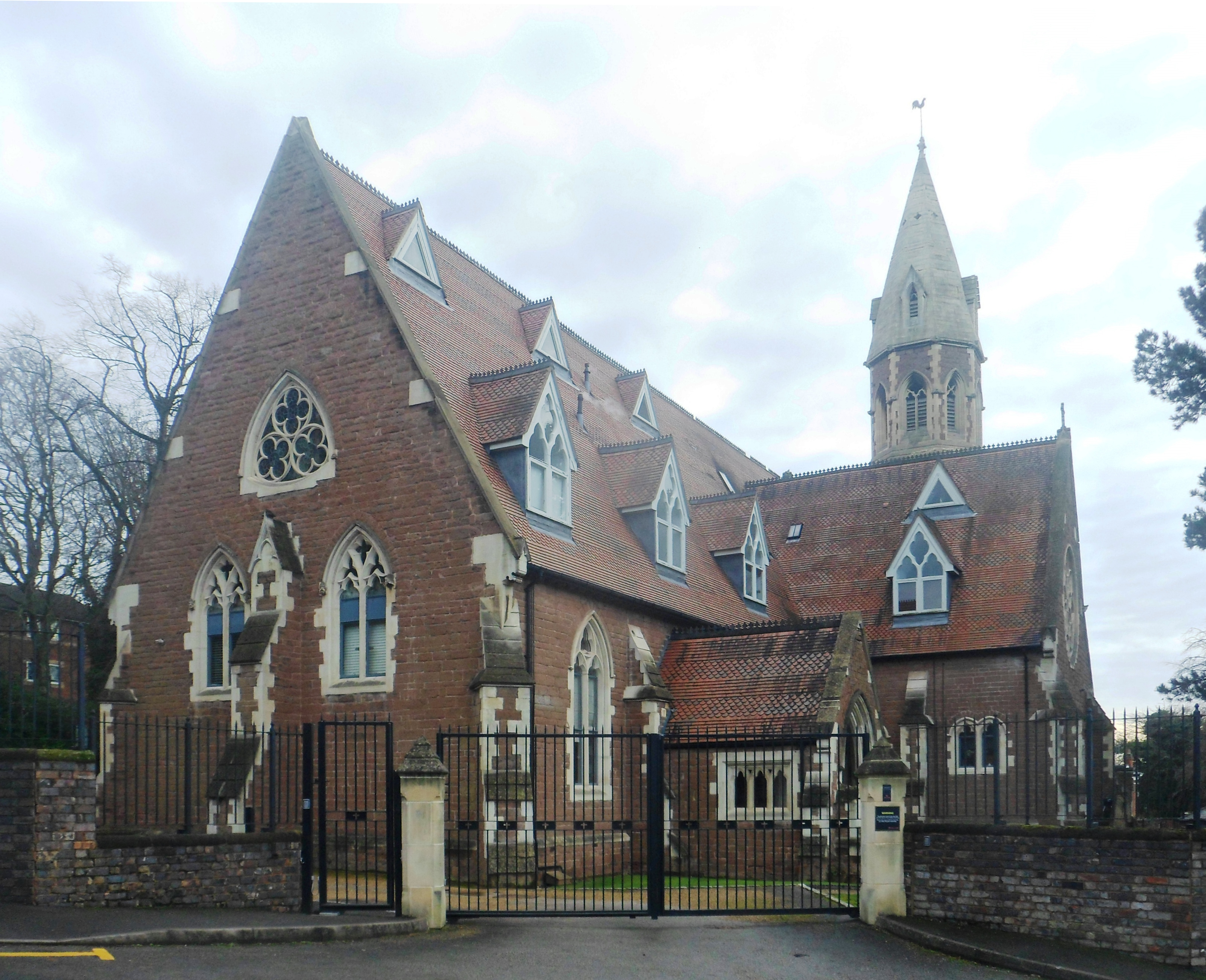
- The building in December 2021
- St James'
- 52°28′2″N 1°54′38″W
- OS grid reference: SP 06176 85474
- Location: Edgbaston, Birmingham
- Country: England
- Denomination: Church of England

History
- Status: Converted to residential use
- Dedication: St James

Architecture
- Heritage designation: Grade II listed
- Architect: Samuel Sanders Teulon
- Completed: 1852
- Construction cost: £3,000

St James is a former parish church in the Church of England in Edgbaston, Birmingham, which was converted into apartments in 2004.

== History ==
The foundation stone was laid in 1851 and the church was built to designs by Samuel Sanders Teulon in the French Gothic Style. The church was consecrated on Tuesday 1 June 1852 by the Bishop of Worcester.

A restoration and cleaning was undertaken in 1867, when improvements were made to the heating and lighting of the church.

On being made redundant by the Church of England in 1967, the building was empty and became vandalised. It was converted by Astley Towne Developments into residential apartments in 2004 at a cost of £1.2 million. The conversion won the following awards:

- Special Design Award, 2004 Birmingham Post and Mail's House Design Awards
- 2005 Renaissance Award, Birmingham Civic Society
- 2007 Award for Building Conservation, Royal Institution of Chartered Surveyors Awards.

== Organ ==
The church contained an organ by Henry Jones which was installed in 1887. A specification of the organ can be found on the National Pipe Organ Register.
