= Hampstead Hill Gardens =

Street in London

Coordinates: 51.555°N 0.169°W

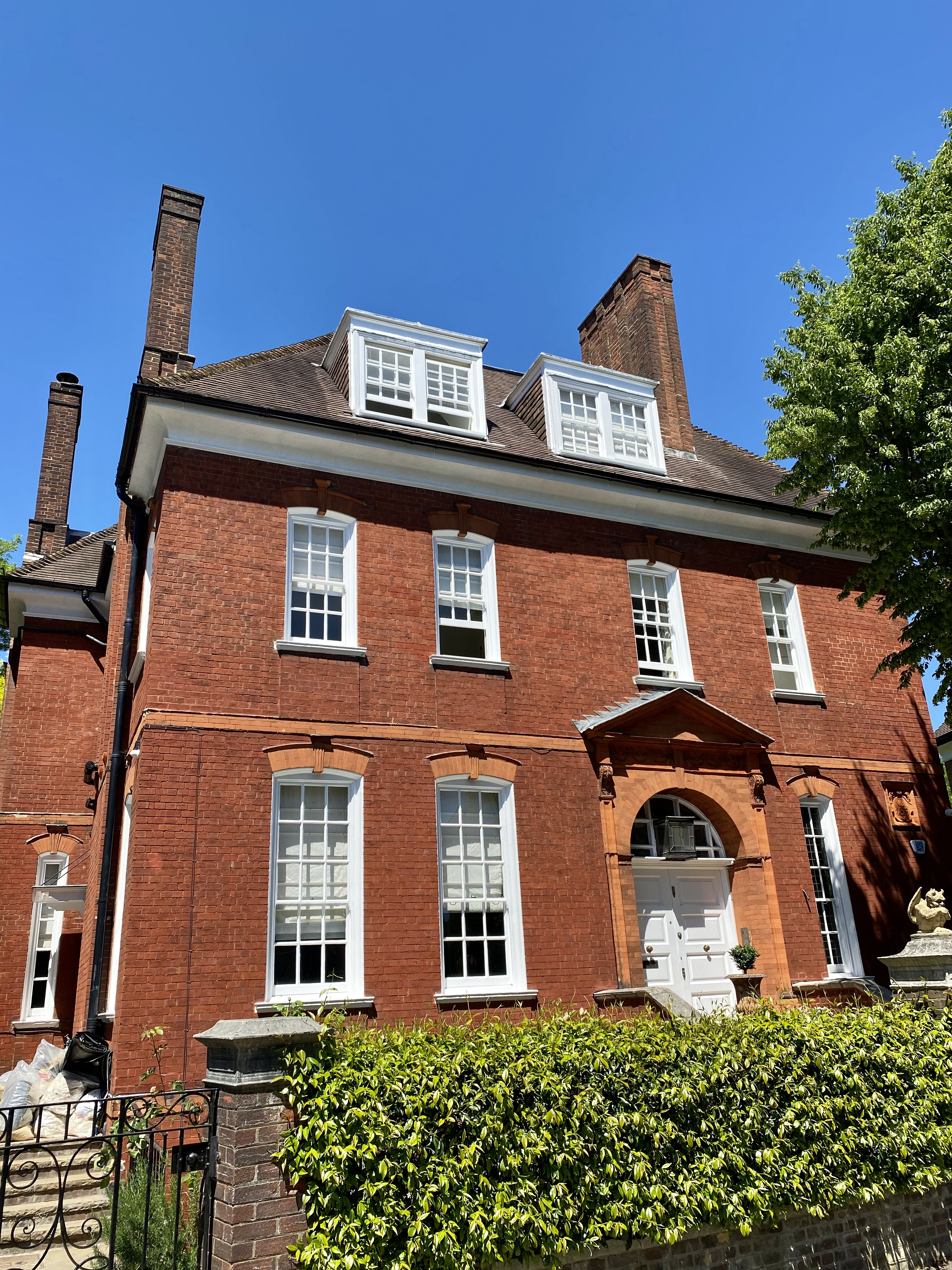
Number 9 Hampstead Hill Gardens

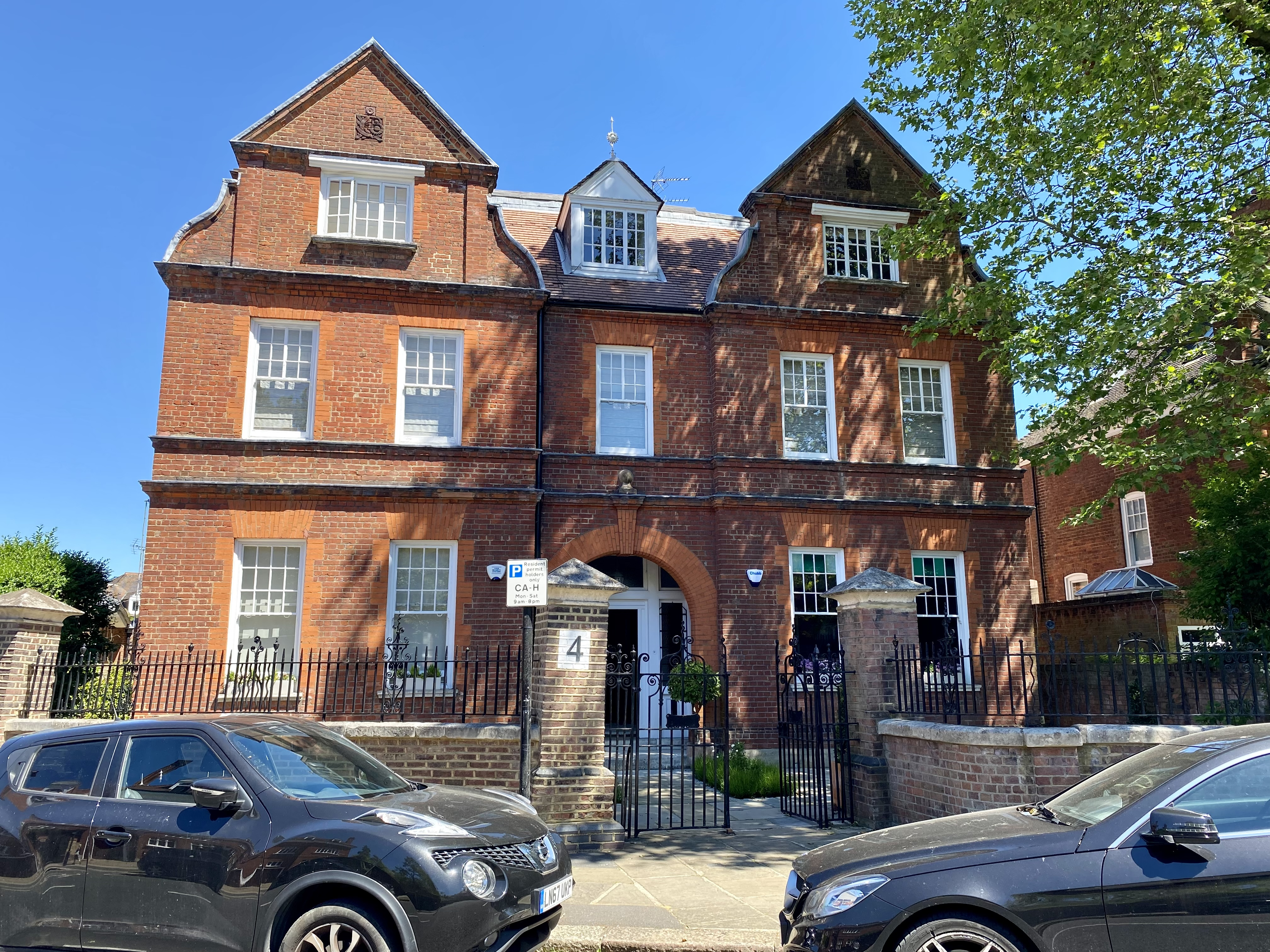
Number 4 Hampstead Hill Gardens

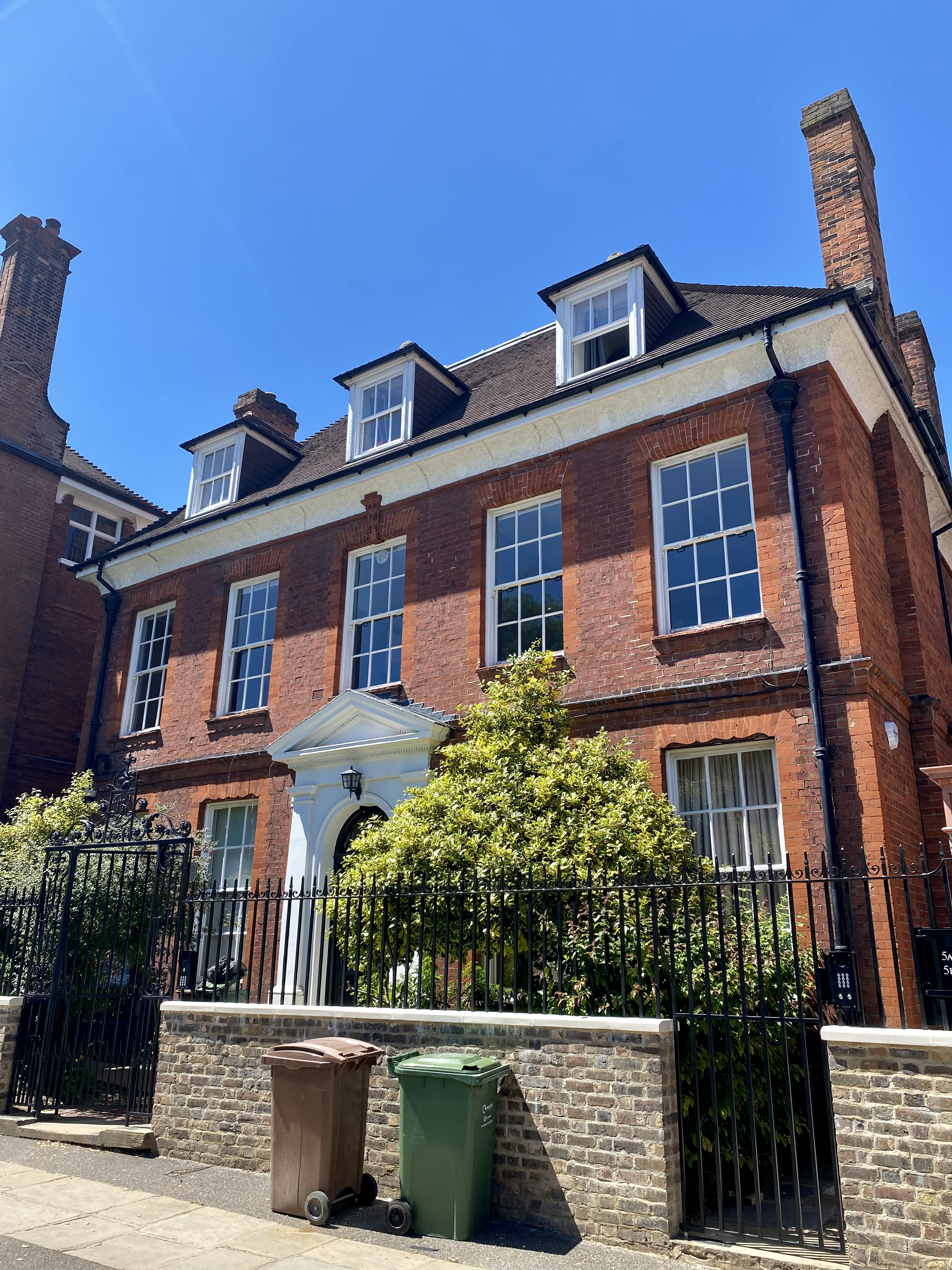
Number 5 Hampstead Hill Gardens

Hampstead Hill Gardens is a street in Hampstead in the London Borough of Camden. It runs eastwards off the Rosslyn Hill stretch of the A502 road before looping round to join Pond Street to the south. The land was considered as a potential location for Hampstead Town Hall before a nearby site on Haverstock Hill was selected. The Hampstead Heath Tunnel of the North London Line passes under the street.

The street contains a mixture of white stucco and red brick buildings. The stucco section of villas near Pond Street was laid out by 1870, but the slightly later red brick Queen Anne Revival houses designed by Thomas Batterbury and W.F. Huxley have attracted more attention from architectural historians. It became known as a centre for artists. Notable residents have included George Bell, Charles Green, Thomas Collier, Sir John Summerson, William Empson, Aldous Huxley, Lord Bragg and Lord Foster of Thames Bank. A number of the buildings are now Grade II listed.

== Bibliography ==
- Cherry, Bridget & Pevsner, Nikolaus. London 4: North. Yale University Press, 2002.
- Glinert, Ed. Literary London: A Street by Street Exploration of the Capital's Literary Heritage. Penguin UK, 2007.
- Sudjic, Deyan. Norman Foster: A Life in Architecture. Hachette UK, 2010.
- Wade, Christopher. The Streets of Belsize. Camden History Society, 1991.
