= St Stephen's Church, Rosslyn Hill =

Grade I listed church in the United Kingdom

Coordinates: 51°33′11.5″N 0°10′6″W

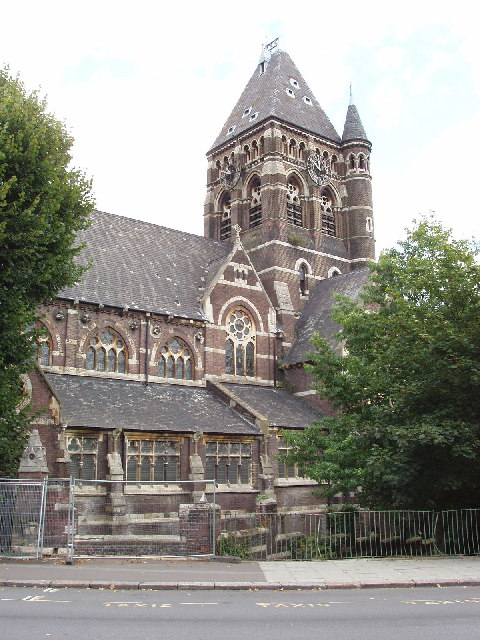
St. Stephen's Church, Rosslyn Hill

St. Stephen's is a former church building in Hampstead, London. It is sited on Rosslyn Hill at its junction with Pond Street, a steep slope adjacent to the Royal Free Hospital, and held up to 1,200 worshippers at its peak.

== History ==
It was designed in the Neo Gothic style by Samuel Sanders Teulon and he considered it the best of the 114 churches he designed, calling it his "mighty church" – it was also the most expensive of them. He accepted the commission to design it after Sir Thomas Maryon Wilson, Lord of the Manor of Hampstead, offered Hampstead Green to be the site for a new church in 1864. From 1864 to 1867 funds were raised (the projected cost was estimated as £7,500; the final sum was actually £27,000). External sculptures are by Thomas Earp. Some mosaics by Salviati have survived in the chancel.

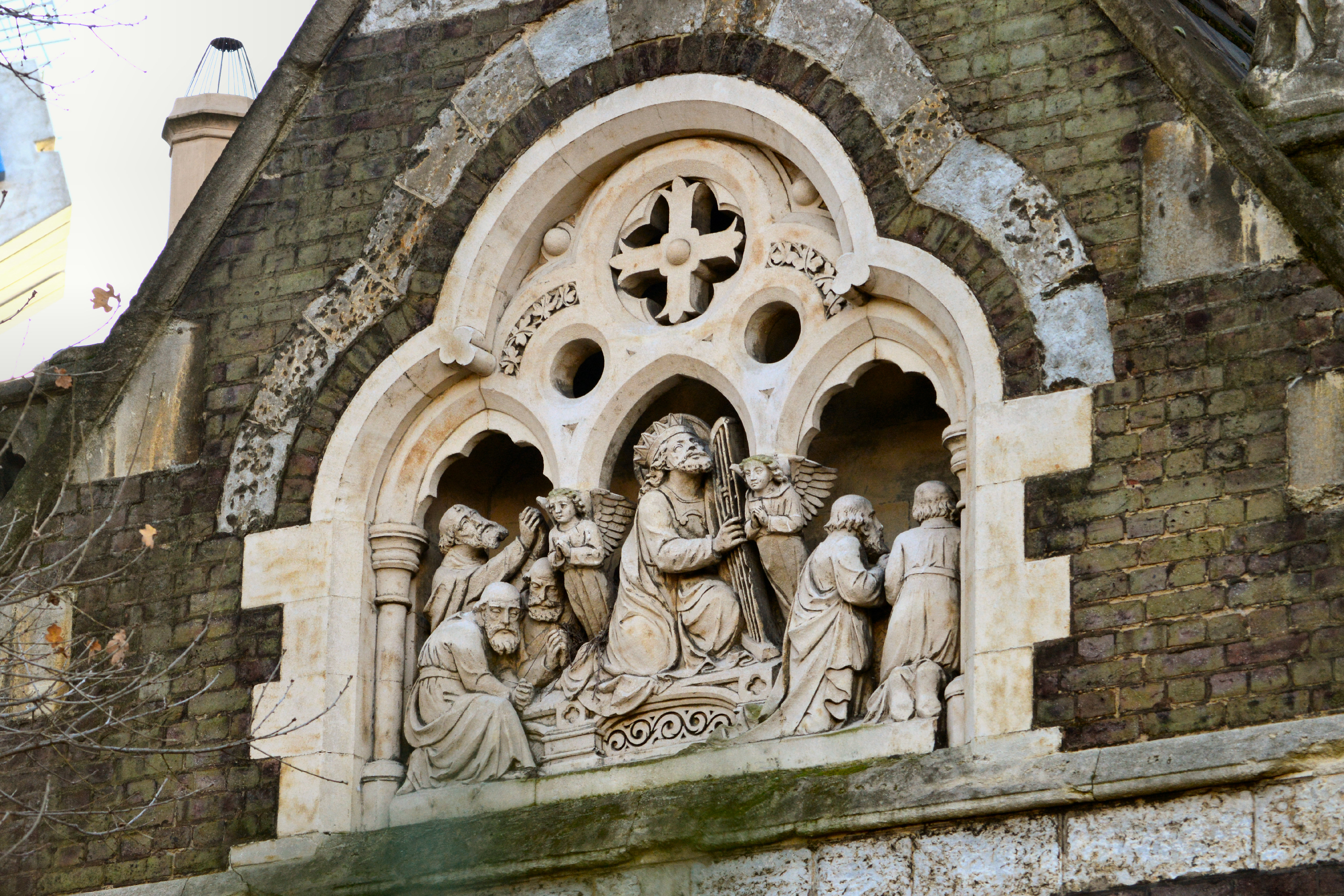
Sculpture by Thomas Earp

Work began in January 1869, with the foundation stone being laid May that year and consecration by John Jackson the Bishop of London occurring on 31 December. It was fully complete by 1870, but was continually prone to subsidence due to its hilly site.

The performer and composer Marie Lloyd Jr. married here in 1907, while the Christian suffragist, writer and female pioneer Margaret Nevinson was buried here in 1932.

By the later 1960s concerns had been raised on structural grounds and, with maintenance costs rising and its congregation declining, it was closed for worship in 1977.

The building was made a Grade I listed building in 1974, which saved it from demolition to provide a car park for the hospital and from being converted into residential flats. However, it went into a slow decay, with squatters moving in, while discussions for a new use dragged on.

In 1999 a lease on the church was awarded to the St Stephen's Restoration and Preservation Trust, and after this body raised over £4 million from English Heritage, the Heritage Lottery Fund, local businesses and individual donors, it was restored to a usable condition in three phases.
