= Church of St Mary the Virgin, Sunbury-on-Thames =

Church in Surrey, England

Coordinates: 51°24′18″N 0°24′40″W

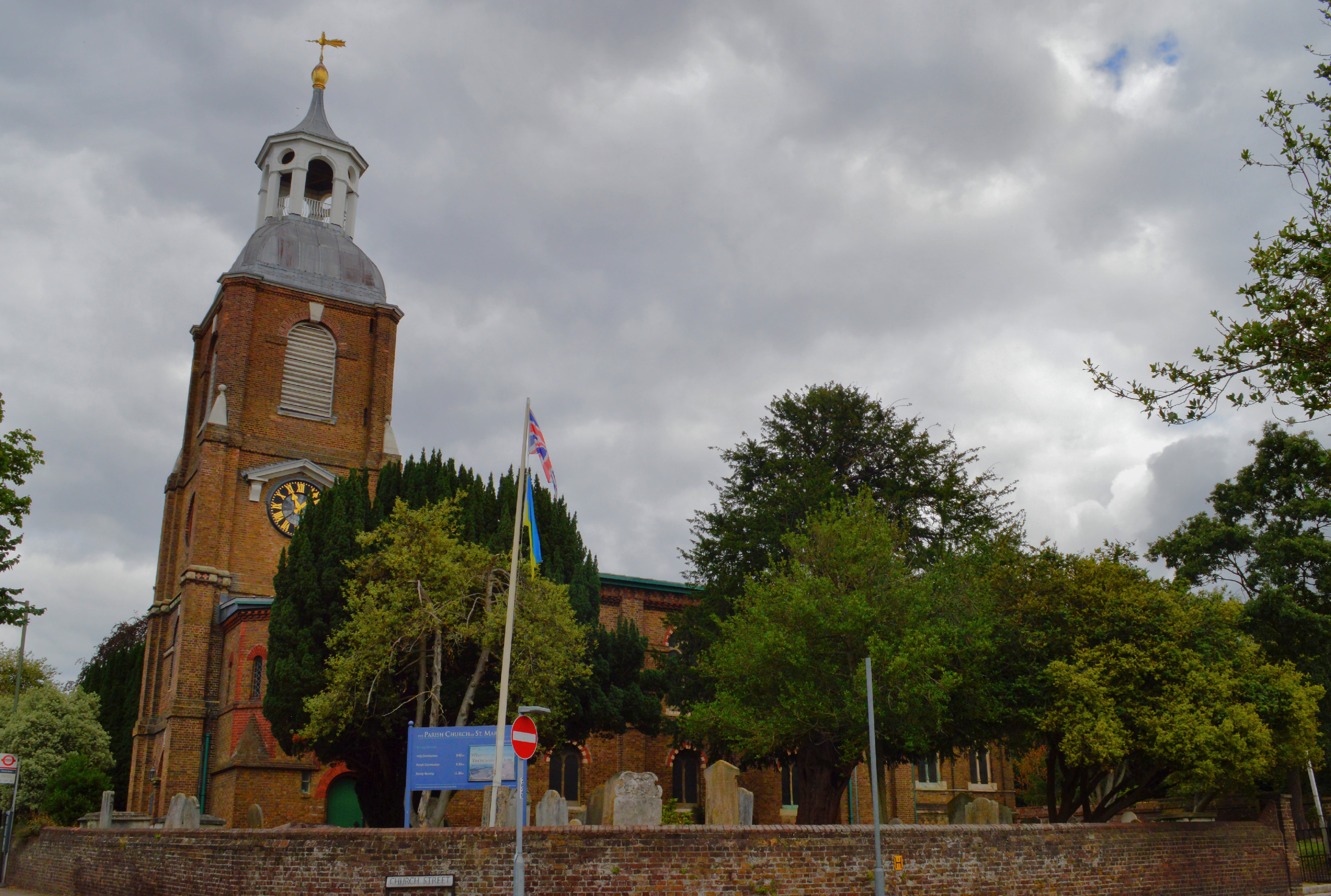
St Mary's Church

The Church of St Mary the Virgin is a Grade II* listed church of the Church of England in the village of Sunbury next to the river Thames.

== History ==
St Mary's Church was rebuilt in 1752, replacing an earlier medieval church. It was designed by Stephen Wright (Clerk of Works to Hampton Court Palace). The church has a tall apsidal (dome-like) chancel with a south chapel and western extensions to aisles added in extensive remodelling designed by architect Samuel Sanders Teulon in 1857. A porch was added in 1871.

In 1900 a choir vestry was added to the north and the interior was extensively remodelled in the 1950s, only Teulon's chancel and chancel chapels remain. Further alterations were made in 1972, including the removal of Teulon's porch, extending the gallery, replacement of pews and the pulpit. The octagonal room under the tower became the entrance porch. The plaque over the doorway records that in 1901 six bells were recast and two more were dedicated. The glass doors were donated in 2001. The iron railings on the gallery are from the old Teulon gallery.

In the chancel are Sgraffito decoration illustrating the gospels, painted by Heywood Sumner in 1892. There are Salviati mosaics and the pillars are decorated with carved foliage representing the seasons. The projecting angels were added between 1892 and 1900. The apse wall is decorated by Seraphims and Christ the King, painted by local artist George Ostreham in 1892. The altar rails were donated in 1949.

The yew tree in the churchyard probably dates from when the new church was completed.

== Monuments ==
The north chapel or Baptistry contains memorials: to Francis (1679) and John Phelps (1680), William Dyer and wife (1737, 1744), and Lady Jane Coke (d 1761). The triptych dates from 1952. Behind to the left is the memorial for John Fish (d 1813), Lord of the Manor of Kempton. The south memorial chapel contains the war memorial and a carved Caen stone reredos. The organ in the west gallery was built by T C Lewis about 1890 and was renovated in 1960 when it was moved from the Baptistry.

== Stained-glass windows ==
The stained glass in the nave and chancel is mostly by Clayton and Bell. The glass in the gallery was designed by George Ostrehan and made by Chater & Son (1898 and 1899).

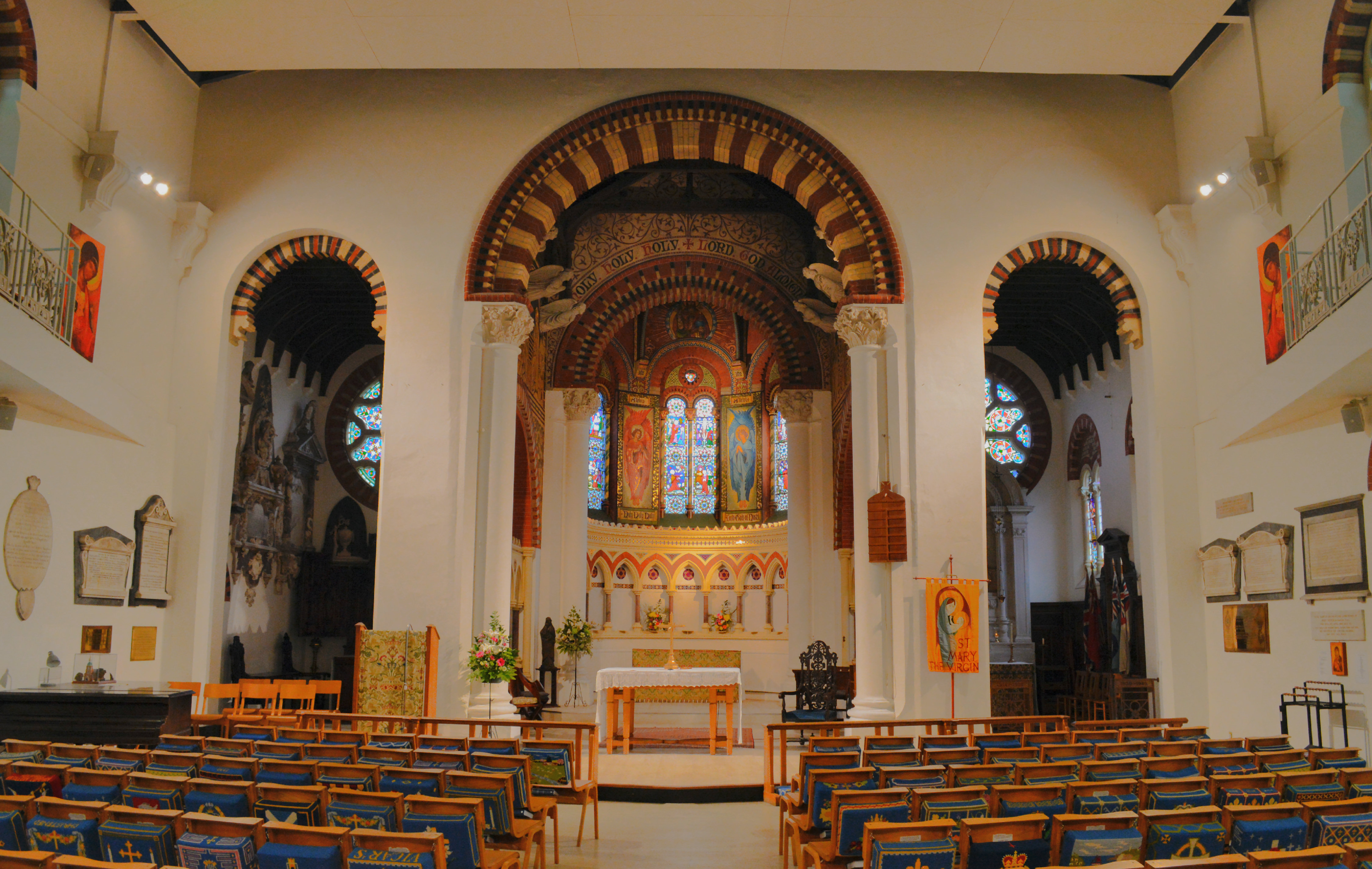
Interior

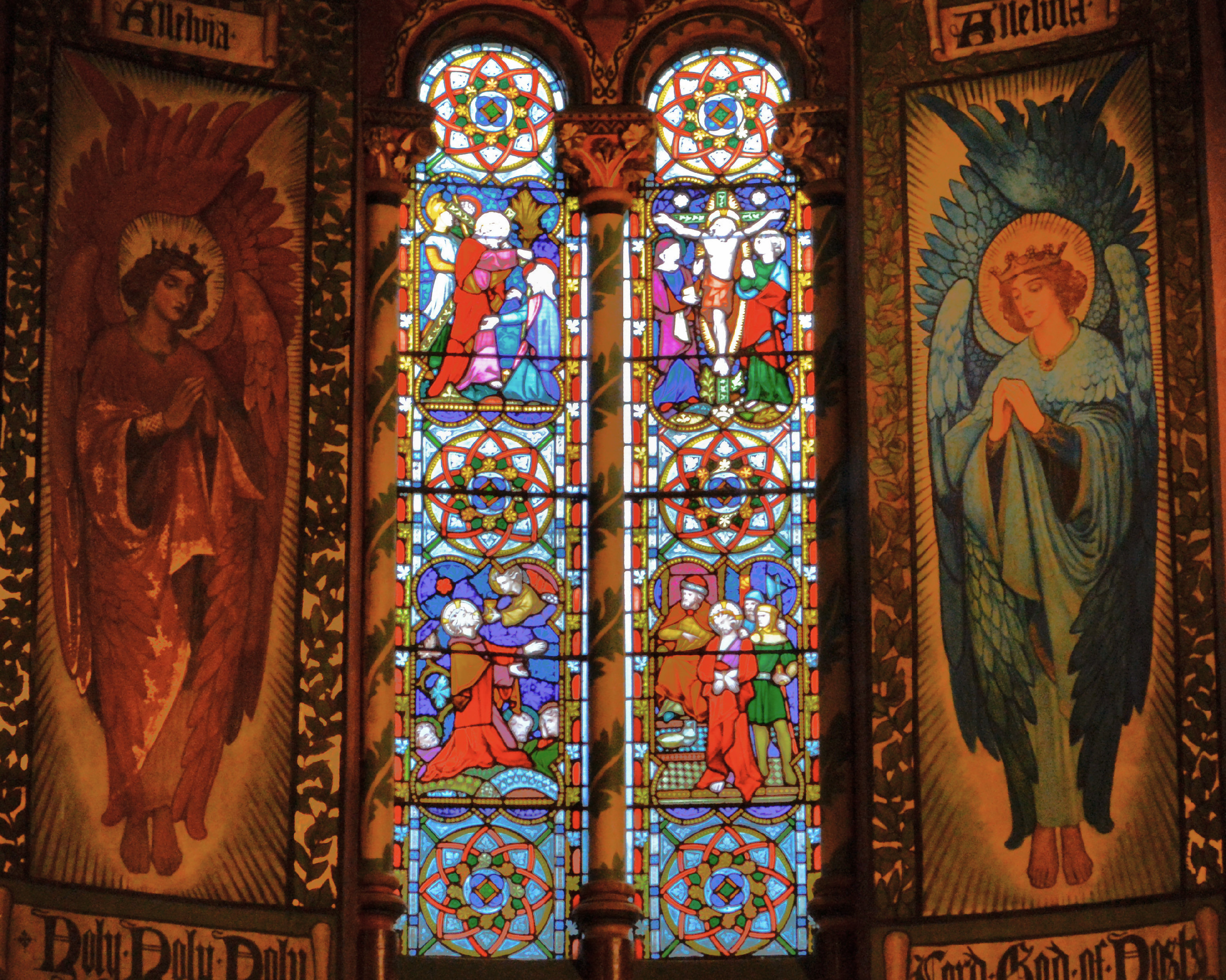
East window

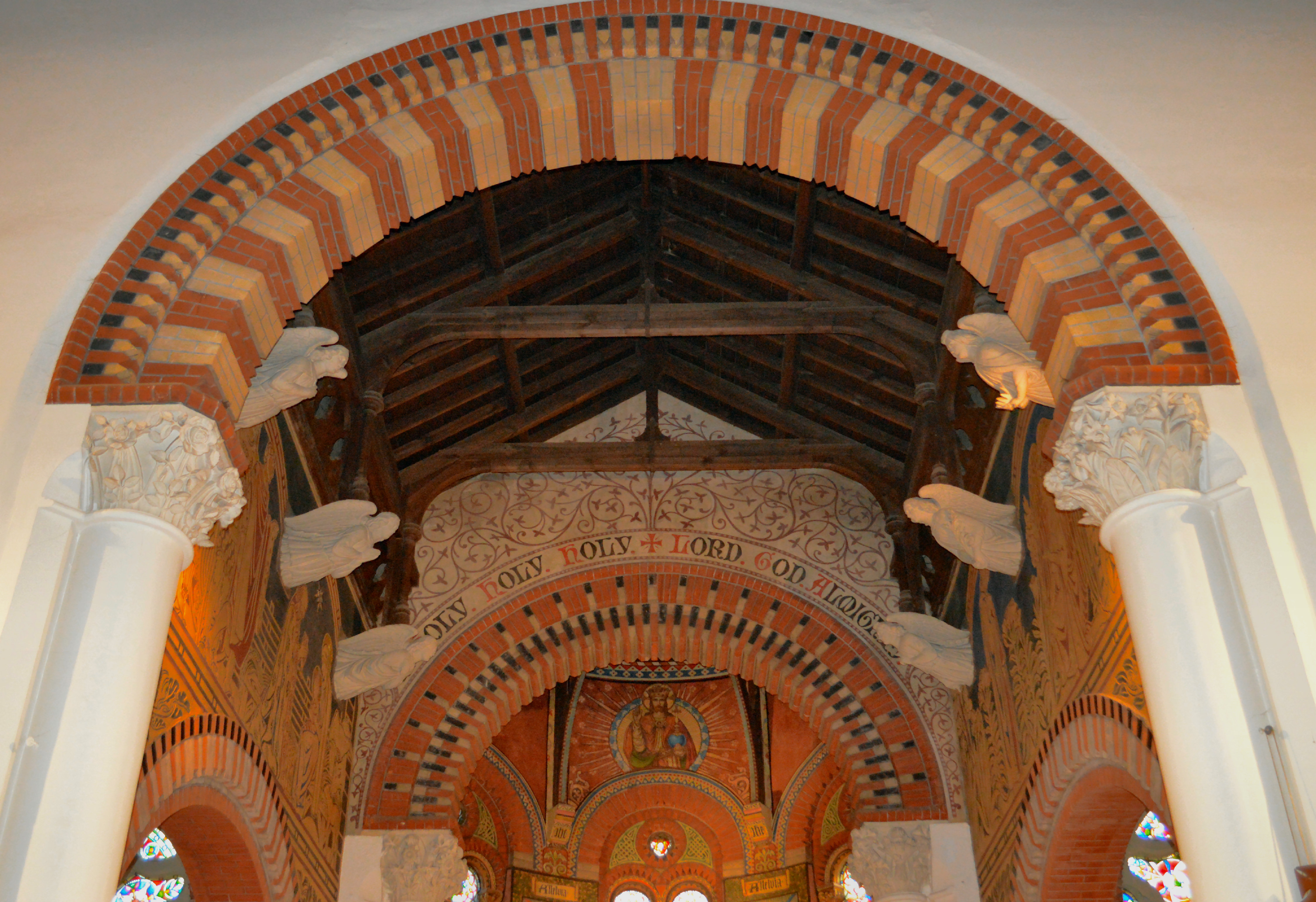
Chancel

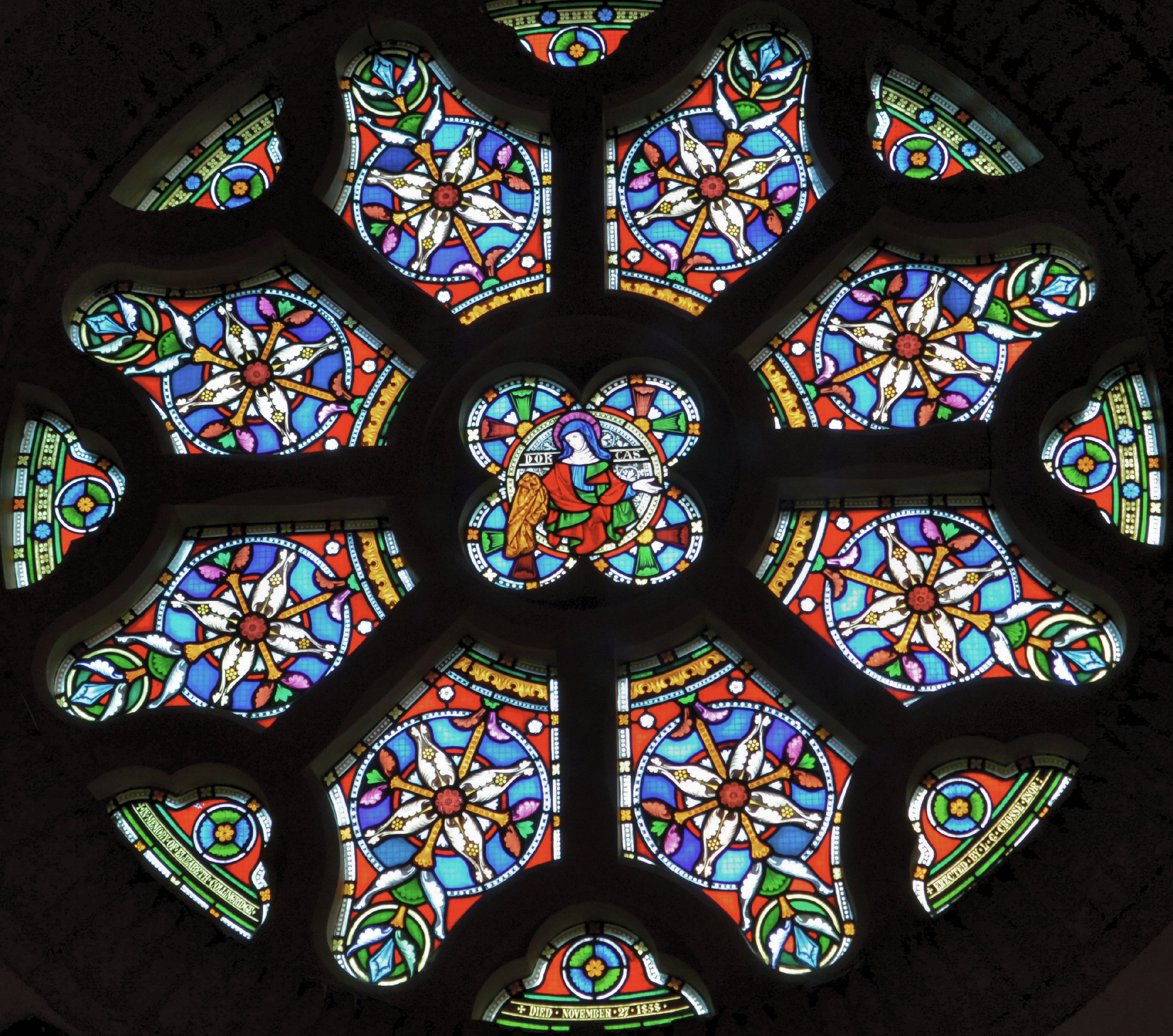
Rose window

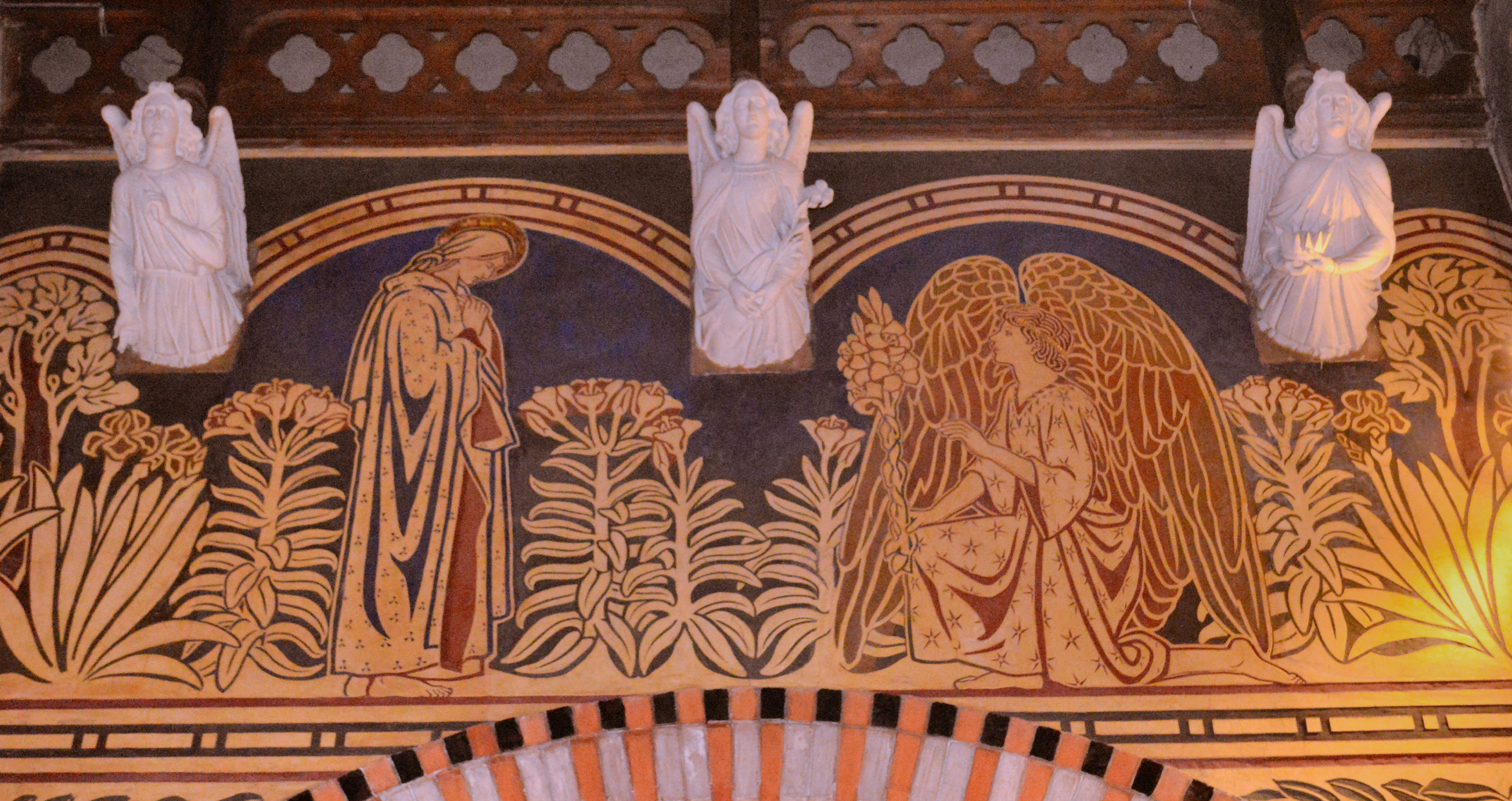
The Annunciation. Sgraffito by George Sumner
