= Burringham =

Village and civil parish in North Lincolnshire, England

Coordinates: 53.57°N 00.74°W

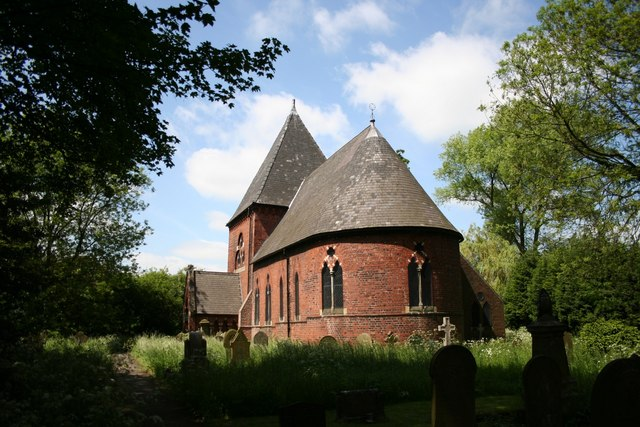
- Church of St John the Baptist, Burringham

- Location within Lincolnshire
- Population: 737 (2011)
- OS grid reference: SE836094
  - London: 140 mi (230 km) SSE
- Unitary authority: North Lincolnshire
- Ceremonial county: Lincolnshire
- Region: Yorkshire and the Humber
- Country: England
- Sovereign state: United Kingdom
- Post town: SCUNTHORPE
- Postcode district: DN17
- Dialling code: 01724
- Police: Humberside
- Fire: Humberside
- Ambulance: East Midlands
- UK Parliament: Scunthorpe

Burringham is a village and civil parish in North Lincolnshire, England. The population of the civil parish at the 2011 census was 737. The village is situated on the B1450 on the east bank of the River Trent approximately 1 mile (1.6 km) south from Gunness.

Burringham's Grade II listed Anglican church is dedicated to St John the Baptist. It was designed by Samuel Sanders Teulon in 1856–67.

The village primary school is halfway between Gunness and Burringham. The public house, Take a Gander, is on the High Street. Burringham used to share the Gunness and Burringham railway station.

A statue stands of Lady Claire Linton, situated by the river bank, in honour of her work during the 1800s building the village hall, both restoring faith and a community feel in the area.
