= Rosslyn Hill =

Road in Camden, London

Coordinates: 51.5535°N 0.1697°W

- Namesake: Rosslyn House, named after the Earl of Rosslyn
- Length: 2.8 km (1.7 mi)
- Location: Hampstead, London
- Nearest metro station: Hampstead Heath railway station
- Major junctions: Hampstead High Street (north), Haverstock Hill (south)

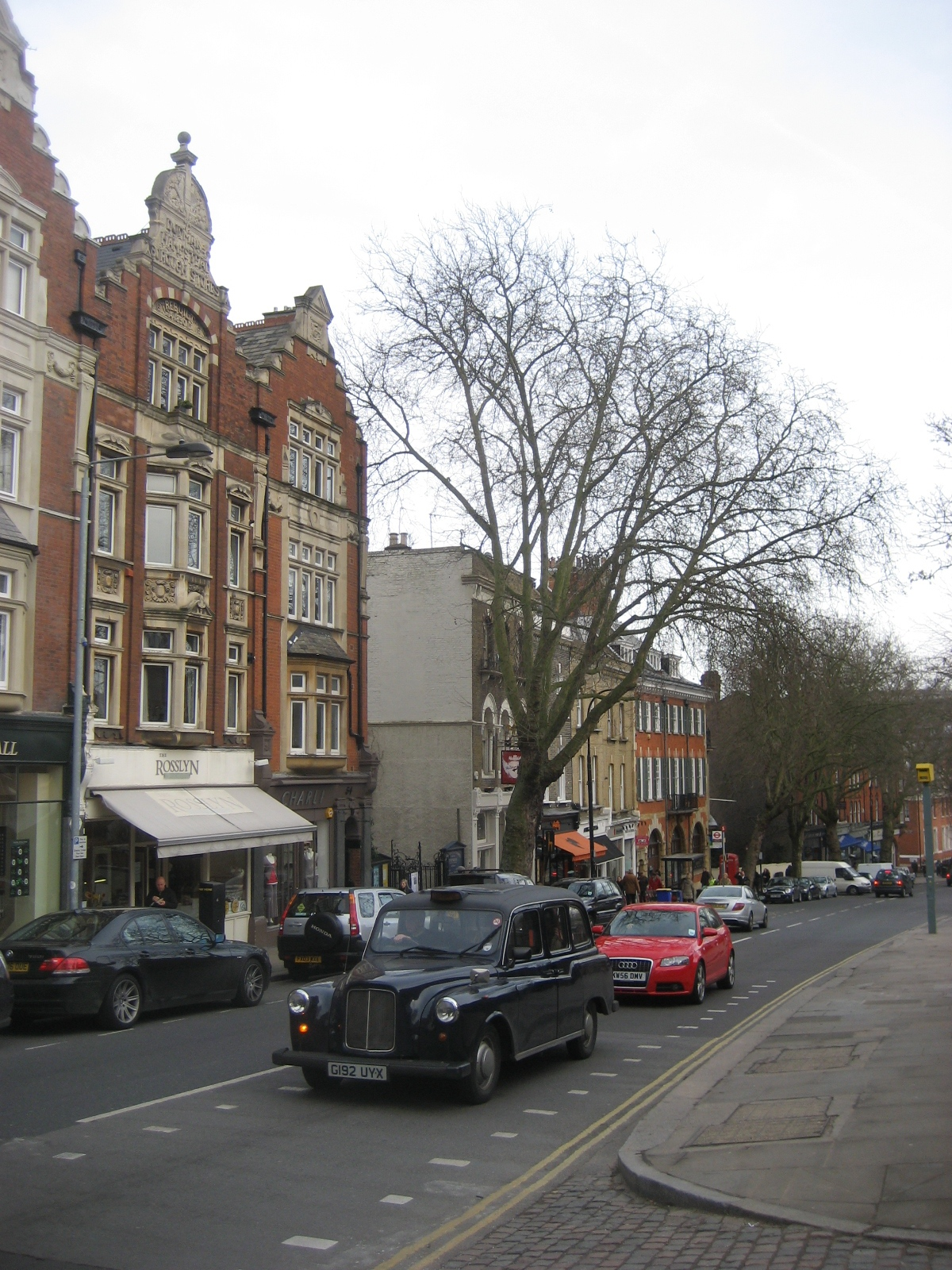
Rosslyn Hill near Willoughby Road

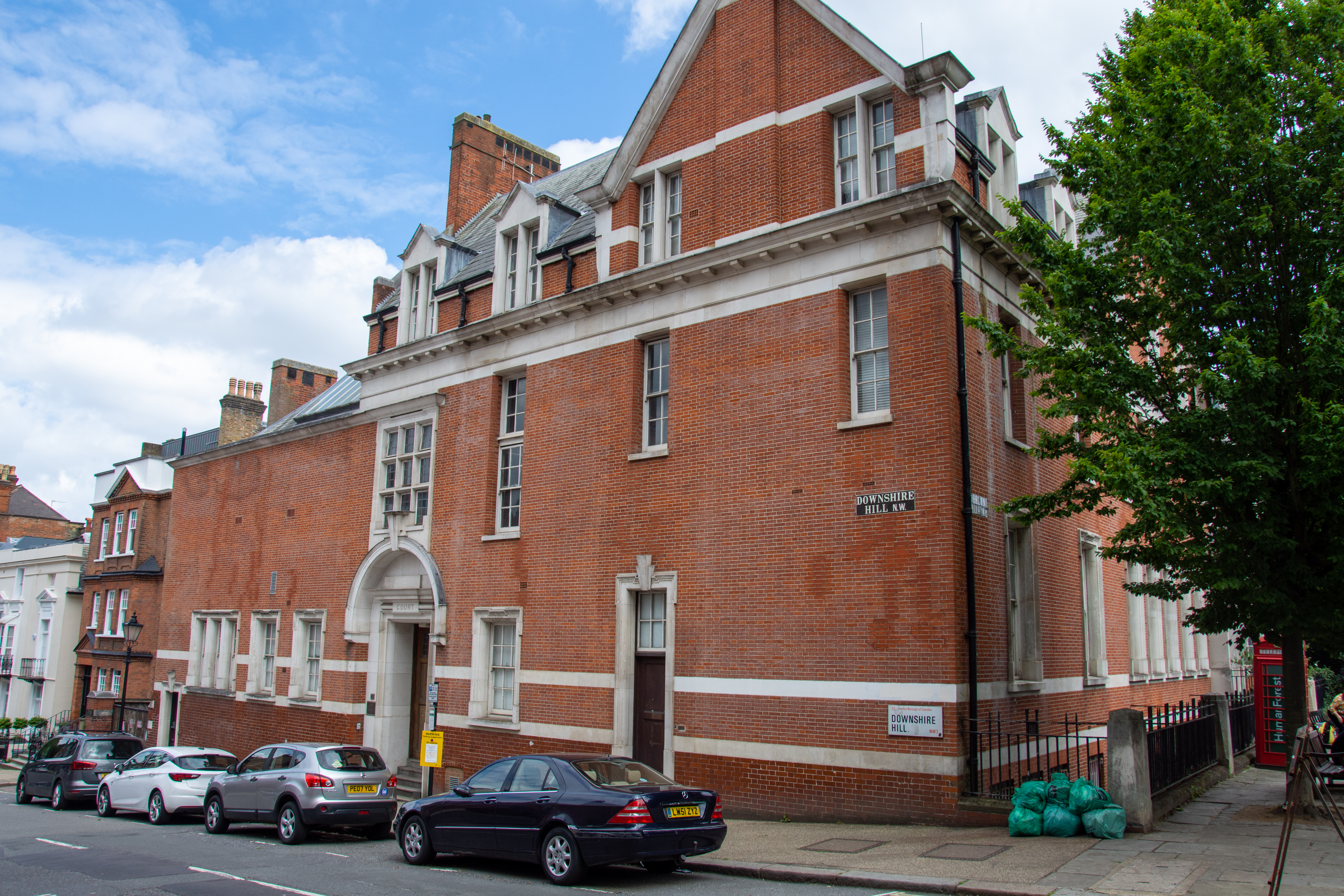
Hampstead Police Station at the junction with Downshire Hill.

Rosslyn Hill is a road in Hampstead, London, connecting the south end of Hampstead High Street to the north end of Haverstock Hill. It is the site of the Rosslyn Hill Unitarian Chapel, St. Stephen's Church and the Royal Free Hospital. It is served by the bus routes N5, C11, 46 and 268. Pond Street links it to Hampstead Heath railway station. Hampstead Hill Gardens runs between Rosslyn Hill and Pond Street.

Haverstock Hill, Rosslyn Hill, and Heath Street, Hampstead together constitute one long hill 2.8 km long, rising 99 m, with an average grade of 3.5% (maximum 8.5%). The street takes its name from Rosslyn House, which stood nearby, and its former owner the Earl of Rosslyn.

== Bibliography ==
- Wade, Christopher. The Streets of Belsize. Camden History Society, 1991.
