= Basil Street =

Street in Knightsbridge, London

Coordinates: 51°30′0″N 0°09′41″W

- Interactive map of Basil Street
- Former name: North Street
- Location: Knightsbridge, London
- Postal code: SW3
- North end: Sloane Street
- Major junctions: Pavilion Road, Rysbrack Street, Hans Crescent
- South end: Walton Place and Hans Road

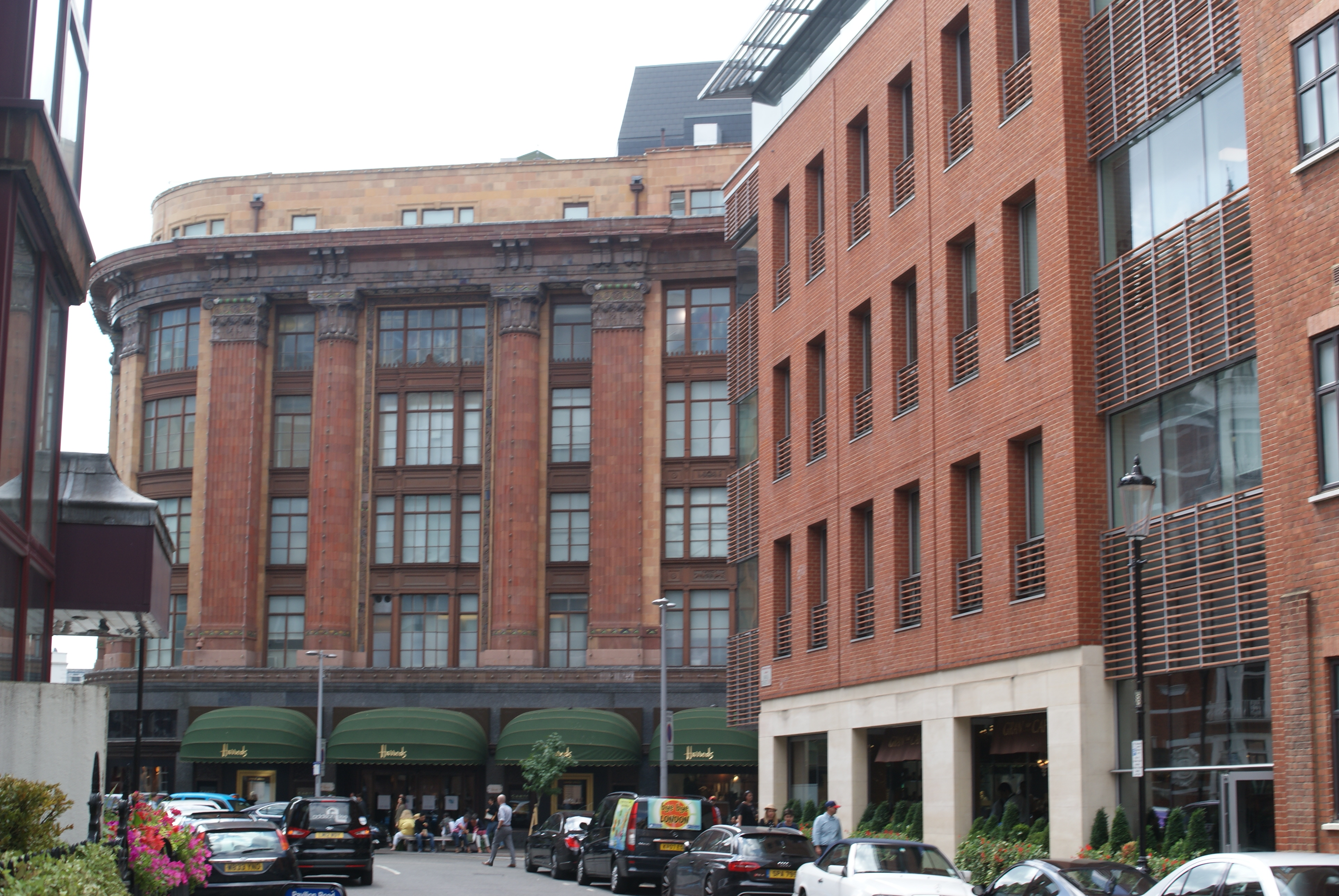
Basil Street looking towards Harrods department store

Basil Street, originally known as North Street, is a street in London's Knightsbridge. It was laid out in the second half of the eighteenth century on land belonging to Lord Cadogan and runs between Sloane Street in the north and the junction of Walton Place and Hans Road in the south. It is joined on its east side by Pavilion Road and Rysbrack Street and crossed by Hans Crescent. Architecturally, it is notable for the design of its blocks of mansion flats. Fashion designer Charles Creed had his premises there after the war and in the 1960s, the first meetings that led to Monty Python's Flying Circus were held at a flat in the street.

== History ==
Basil Street was laid out in the second half of the eighteenth century on land belonging to Lord Cadogan, when it was named North Street. It was well developed by the time of Richard Horwood's map of 1794. It retained the name North Street until the start of the twentieth century when it was renamed Basil Street, the origins of which name are unknown.

== Buildings (north to south) ==
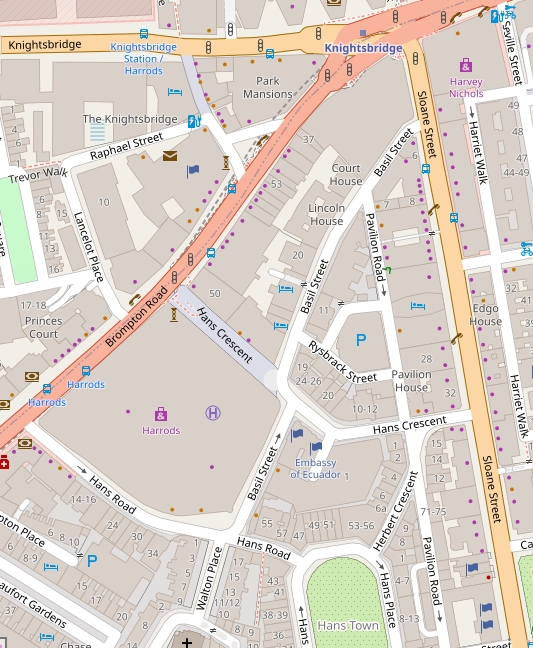
Basil Street area map

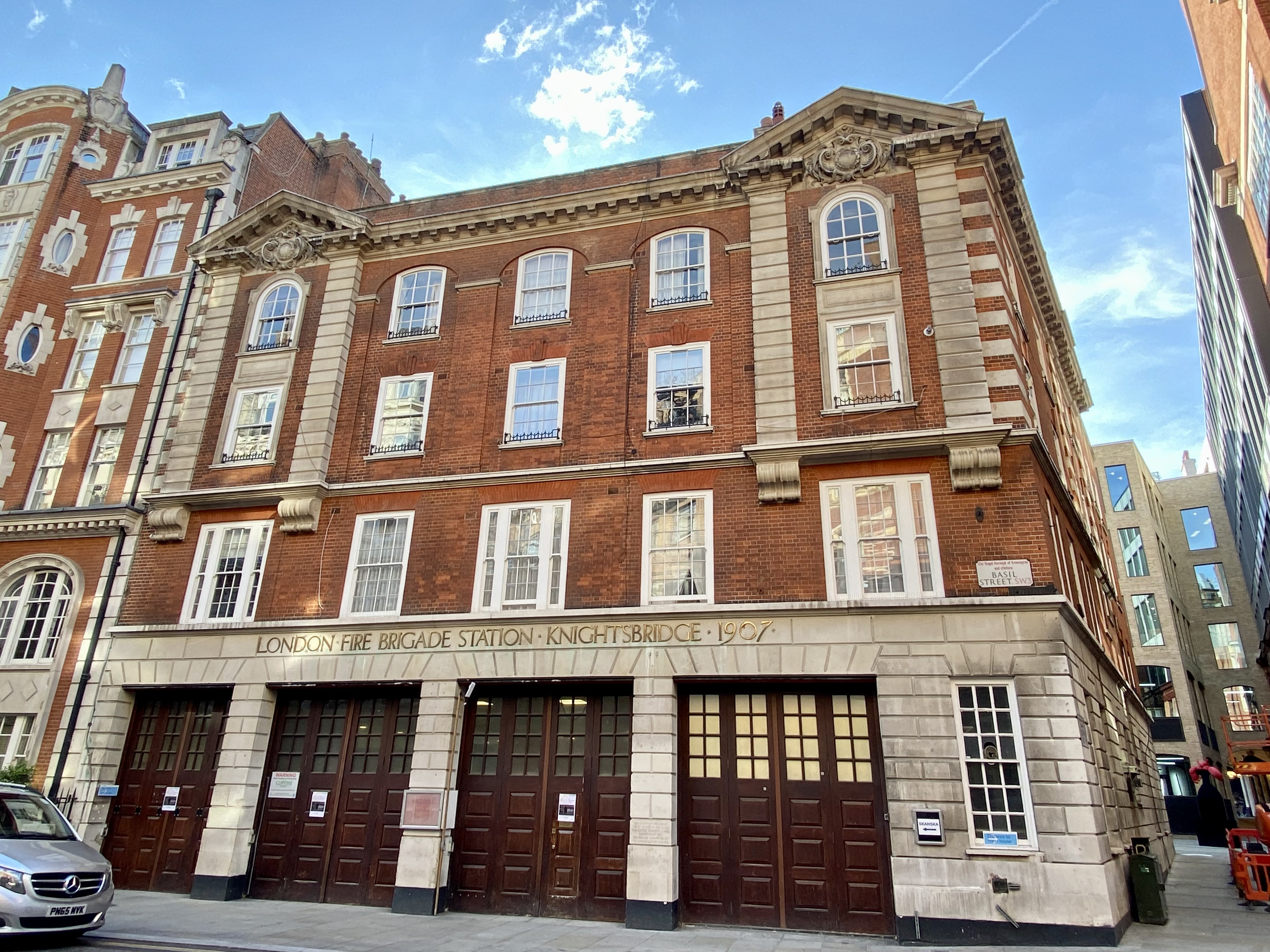
The former Knightsbridge fire station

16 Basil Street was purpose built as Knightsbridge fire station for the London Fire Brigade, and operated as such from 1907 until it closed in 2014. It was built in a "restrained free Baroque style", and the lead architects were Owen Fleming and Charles Winmill, who had previously worked for the LCC Housing Department. The upper floors have been converted to residential use.

The street was noted by Cherry and Pevsner for its "exuberant 1890s mansion flats sporting flurries of curvaceous bows and balconies". Lincoln House, a pair of identical mansion blocks on the west side designed in 1903 by John A. Gill Knight for Harry Johnson, are grade II listed with Historic England. They were built in 1915-16 and are noted for their "idiosyncratic design, illustrative of the best of mansion block architecture in the period". They were originally one block but were sub-divided by J. Hunt in 1947 following damage during the Second World War.

The Capital Hotel, a small 5-star hotel, along with The Capital Restaurant are located at 22–24 Basil Street and further south the Embassy of Colombia is located on the corner of Hans Crescent and Basil Street.

The west side of the southern end of Basil Street below Hans Crescent is entirely taken up by the rear of the Harrods department store. Opposite Harrods, there is an underground car park, and in October 2021 a space there was listed for sale at £250,000 for an 82-year lease with £780 a year in service charges.

== Former residents ==
Fashion designer Charles Creed was at 31 Basil Street after the Second World War, having escaped the German occupation of Paris by hours. He had his premises there until his death in 1966. They were masculine in tone, with dark panelling on the walls and displays of Napoleonic toy soldiers (Creed had a fine collection that was later to be the subject of a British Pathé film).

The Basil Street Hotel was at 8 Basil Street for many years before it was sold and closed in September 2005. The biographer Michael Holroyd, born in 1935, entitled his memoirs Basil Street Blues, based on his having been conceived there. According to the Rough Guide to London it had " a variety of idiosynchratically decorated rooms" and past guests included James Stewart during the Second World War.

From 1968, John Cleese and his then wife Connie Booth lived at Flat 28, Lincoln House, a mansion block in the street. The earliest meetings that led to Monty Python's Flying Circus were held in the flat, in early May 1969. Cleese practised "silly walks" in the corridor, leading one neighbour to question him about the strange noises.
