= Boundary Estate =

Housing estate in Tower Hamlets, England

Coordinates: 51.526°N 0.074°W

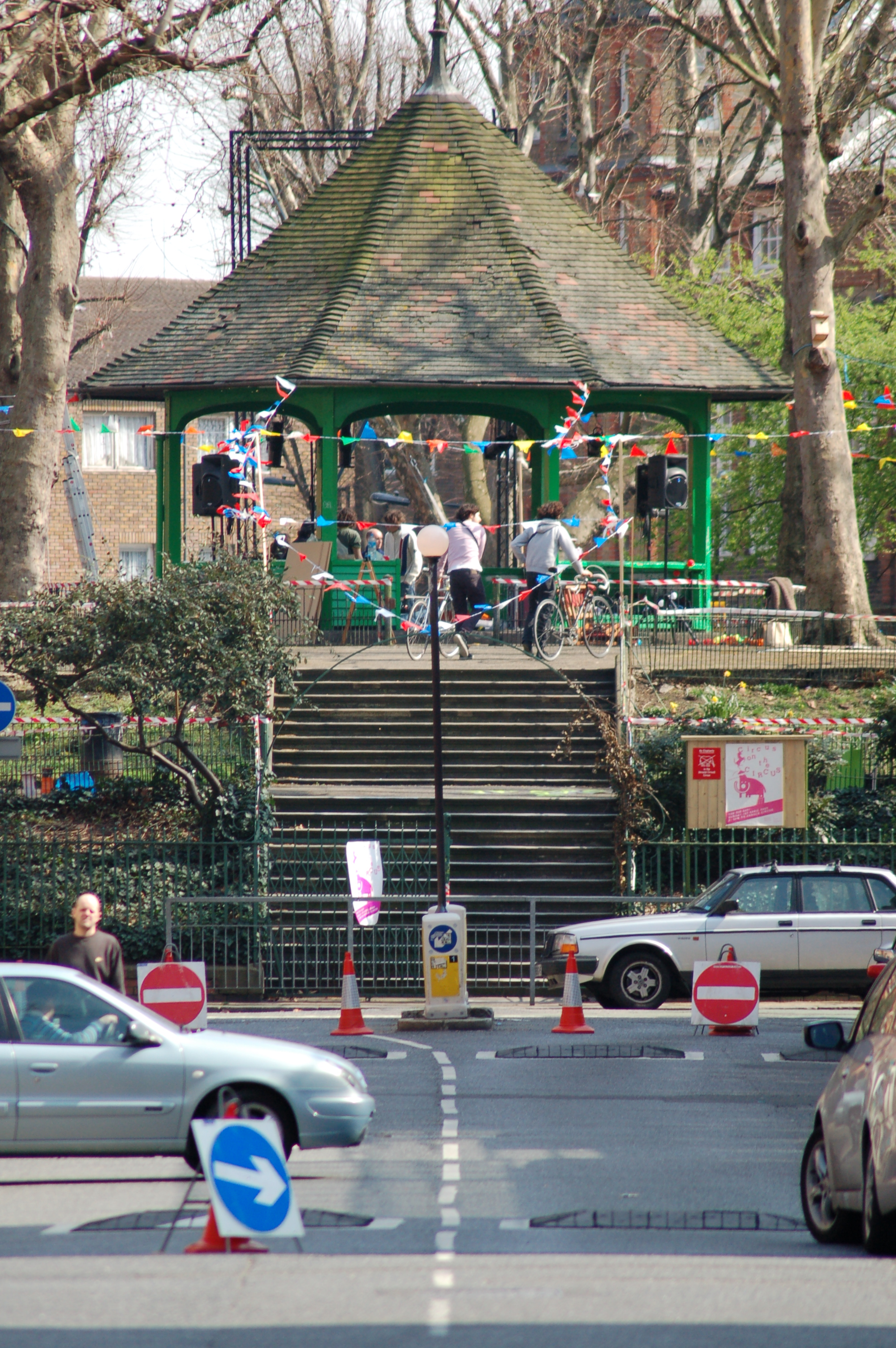
The Boundary Estate bandstand at Arnold Circus, built from soil beneath the Old Nichol slum, is the centrepiece of the estate

The Boundary Estate is a housing development in the London Borough of Tower Hamlets, in the East End of London.

The estate, constructed from 1890, was one of the earliest social housing schemes built by a local government authority. It was built on the site of the demolished Friars Mount rookery in the Old Nichol, with works begun by the Metropolitan Board of Works in 1893 and completed by the recently formed London County Council.

Soil from the foundations was used to construct a mound in the middle of Arnold Circus at the centre of the development, surmounted by an extant bandstand. The estate consists of multistorey brick tenements radiating from the central circus, each of which bears the name of a town or village along the non-tidal reaches of the Thames.

For administrative purposes, the estate lay just within the boundaries of the historical parish and (from 1900) Metropolitan Borough of Bethnal Green, which in 1965 became part of the new London Borough of Tower Hamlets. For ecclesiastical purposes, it lay within the parish of Holy Trinity, Shoreditch, created in 1866. The estate's name reflects its borderline location.

== History ==
=== Old Nichol rookery ===
In 1680, John Nichol of Gray's Inn, who had built seven houses here, leased 4.75 acres (1.92 ha) of gardens for 180 years to a London mason, Jon Richardson, with permission to dig for bricks. The land became piecemeal with houses built by several sub-lessees. Many of the streets were named after Nichol, and by 1827, the 5-acre (2.0 ha) estate consisted of 237 houses.

Henry Mayhew visited Bethnal Green in 1850, and noted for The Morning Chronicle the trades in the area: tailors, costermongers, shoemakers, dustmen, sawyers, carpenters, cabinet makers and silkweavers. In the area, it was noted:

Roads were unmade, often mere alleys, small houses without foundations, subdivided and often around unpaved courts. An almost total lack of drainage and sewerage was made worse by the ponds formed by the excavation of brickearth. Pigs and cows in back yards, noxious trades like boiling tripe, melting tallow, or preparing cat's meat, slaughter houses, dustheaps, and 'lakes of putrefying night soil' added to the filth.

In about 1860, in A Visit to the Rookery of St Giles and its Neighbourhood, he mentions the area again and uses the term rookery.

The vicar of St Philip's, the church serving the Nichol, quoted by Frederick Engels, stated that in 1844 "conditions were far worse than in a northern industrial parish, that population density was 8.6 people to a (small) house, and that there were 1,400 houses in an area less than 400 yd (370 m) square"; and in 1861 John Hollingshead, of The Morning Post, in his Ragged London noted that the Nichol had grown even more squalid in the last 20 years as old houses decayed and traditional trades became masks for thieves and prostitutes. The Builder in 1863, noted the numbers inhabiting unfit cellars, the lack of sanitation and that running water was only available for 10–12 minutes each day.

For ecclesiastical purposes, the Old Nichol was part of the parish of Holy Trinity, Shoreditch, from 1866. However, there was no church building and services were held in a hay loft above a stable. Eventually, a site on Old Nichol Street was built.

=== Demand for change ===
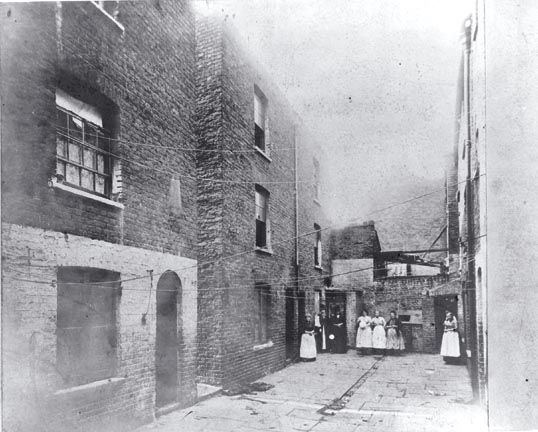
Boundary Street in 1890, three years before the London County Council began slum clearance.

The clearance of the slum houses of the Old Nichol Street rookery was the result of an energetic campaign by the local incumbent, Reverend Osborne Jay of Holy Trinity, who arrived in the parish in December 1886. Charles Booth had already noted the extreme poverty in the area in his study of London poverty. Nearly 6,000 people lived (and often worked) in the packed streets. The death rate from violent crime was 40 per 1000, twice that of the rest of Bethnal Green, and four times that of London. One child in four died before their first birthday.

Redevelopment had been resisted by members of the Bethnal Green vestry, who owned much of the rookery and were responsible for electing the Metropolitan Board of Works members. The powers of the vestries and board were limited to the Torrens Act and the Artisans' and Labourers' Dwellings Improvement Act 1875 (Cross Act), which the Bethnal Green vestry refused to use.

Jay persuaded Arthur Morrison to visit the area, and the result was the influential A Child of the Jago, a barely fictionalised account of the life of a child in the slum, re-christened by Morrison as The Jago: "What was too vile for Kate Street, Seven Dials, and Ratcliffe Highway in its worst day, what was too useless, incapable and corrupt — all that teemed on the Old Jago." Journalist Sarah Wise wrote that, according to historian David Rich, Morrison came up with the name Jago because "it's where Jay goes". Demolition began before the publication of the book.

The London County Council was created by the Local Government (England and Wales) Act 1888, some 53 years after other major cities had been municipalised. It took responsibility for housing the working classes from the Metropolitan Board of Works. In the first election, the progressives obtained a large majority. The Housing Committee secured from Parliament the Housing of the Working Classes Act 1890 (53 & 54 Vict. c. 70), which gave it powers to implement the Torrens and Cross acts and a legal basis for managing housing estates. LCC chose Boundary Street as their flagship scheme. Initially, they attempted to get the private sector involved but failed. In 1893, on the back of the Blackwall Tunnel Act 1892, they gained permission from the Home Secretary to rebuild a small section of the scheme. The principle was established.

=== The Boundary Street Scheme ===
A 1908 map showing the completed estate

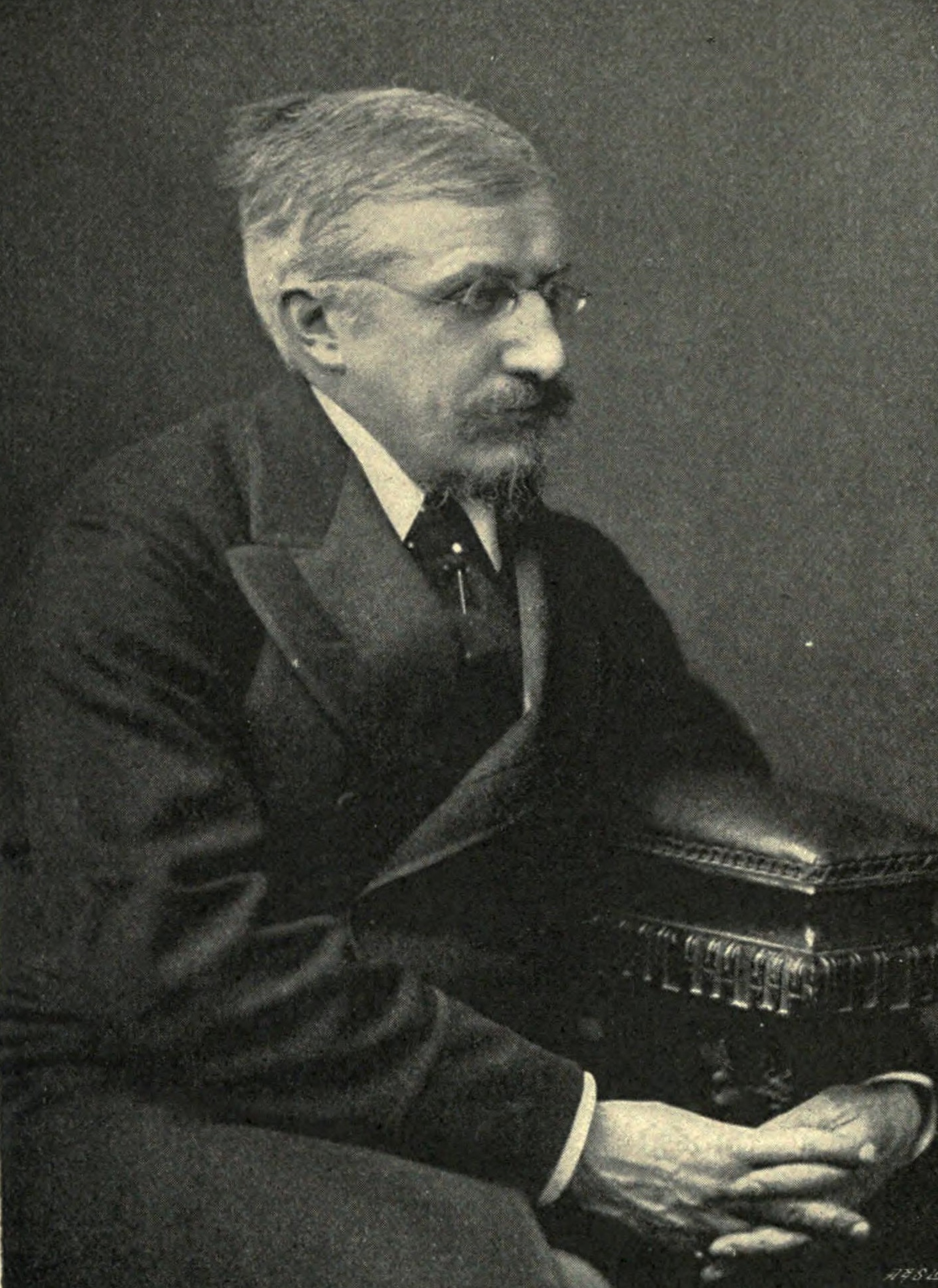
Alderman Arthur Arnold, Chairman of LCC

The newly established London County Council (LCC) decided to rebuild an area of some 15-acre (6.1 ha), including the Nichol and Snow estates, and a small piece on the Shoreditch side of Boundary Street, formerly Cock Lane. What became known as the Bethnal Green Improvement Scheme displaced 5,719 people and demolished 730 houses. It was initially planned as a series of rectangular plots, but in 1893, a radial plan that would house more people was approved.

Owen Fleming designed the Boundary Street scheme. He retained only Boundary Street in the west and Mount Street in the east, though he widened both to 40 ft (12 m). Old Nichol Street was also widened and extended to Mount Street, then renamed Swanfield Street. He designed 50 ft (15 m). wide tree-lined streets to radiate from an ornamental space called Arnold Circus. The LCC architects designed 21 and Rowland Plumbe, two of 23 blocks containing 10 and 85 tenements each. A total of 1,069 tenements, mostly two or three-roomed, were planned to accommodate 5,524 people. The project was hailed as setting "new aesthetic standards for housing the working classes" and included a new laundry, 18 shops, and 77 workshops. Churches and schools were preserved. Building for the project began in 1893. The two schools, Rochelle School, which was built in 1879, and Virginia School, built in 1887, predate the estate.

The new flats replaced the existing slums with decent accommodation for the same number of people, but the occupiers changed. The original inhabitants were forced further to the East, creating new overcrowding and new slums in areas such as Dalston and Bethnal Green. No help was offered to those displaced to find new accommodation, and this added to the suffering and misery of many of the former residents of the slum. The new blocks had policies to enforce sobriety; the new tenants were, for example, clerks, policemen, cigarmakers and nurses.

Such was the success of the campaign that the Prince of Wales officially opened the estate in early March 1900, saying Few indeed will forget this site who had read Mr Morrison's A Child of the Jago, and all of us are familiar with the labours of that most excellent philanthropist, Mr. Jay, in this neighbourhood.

The impresarios and brothers Lew Grade and Bernard Delfont (born Winogradsky) moved to the Boundary Estate in 1914 from nearby Brick Lane and attended Rochelle Street School. At that time, 90% of children attending the school spoke Yiddish.

=== Revival ===
Tower Hamlets Council has proposed transferring the estate to a housing association and upgrading the accommodation. Sprunt Architects carried out a full refurbishment of one of the blocks, Iffley House, to demonstrate how this might be achieved but a ballot of tenants rejected the proposal in November 2006.

The estate radiates from a centrepiece roundabout, Arnold Circus, formed around a garden with a bandstand. The Friends of Arnold Circus are now preserving it and have received regeneration grants. Restoration work on the bandstand was completed in 2010.

Arnold Circus is also a landmark on several ley alignments, including Alfred Watkins' "Strand Ley" and "The Coronation Line," which is curious, as before 1893, there was no intersection or feature here.

One of the roads that links into the circus is the northern end of Club Row, a part of Brick Lane market, well known as an animal market until this activity was closed down in 1983.

== Conservation area ==
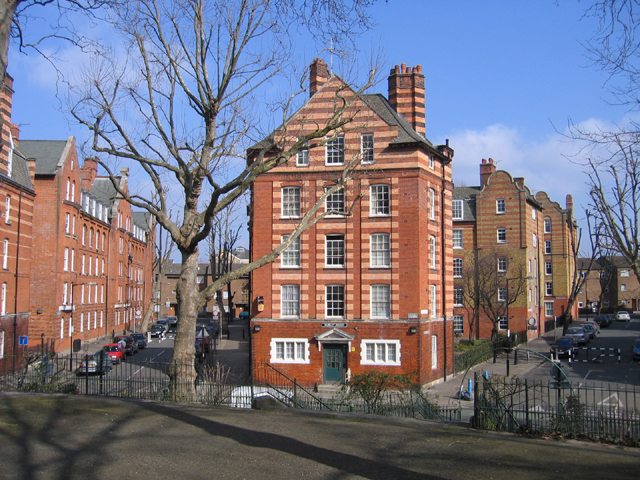
Hurley House from Arnold Circus, 2006

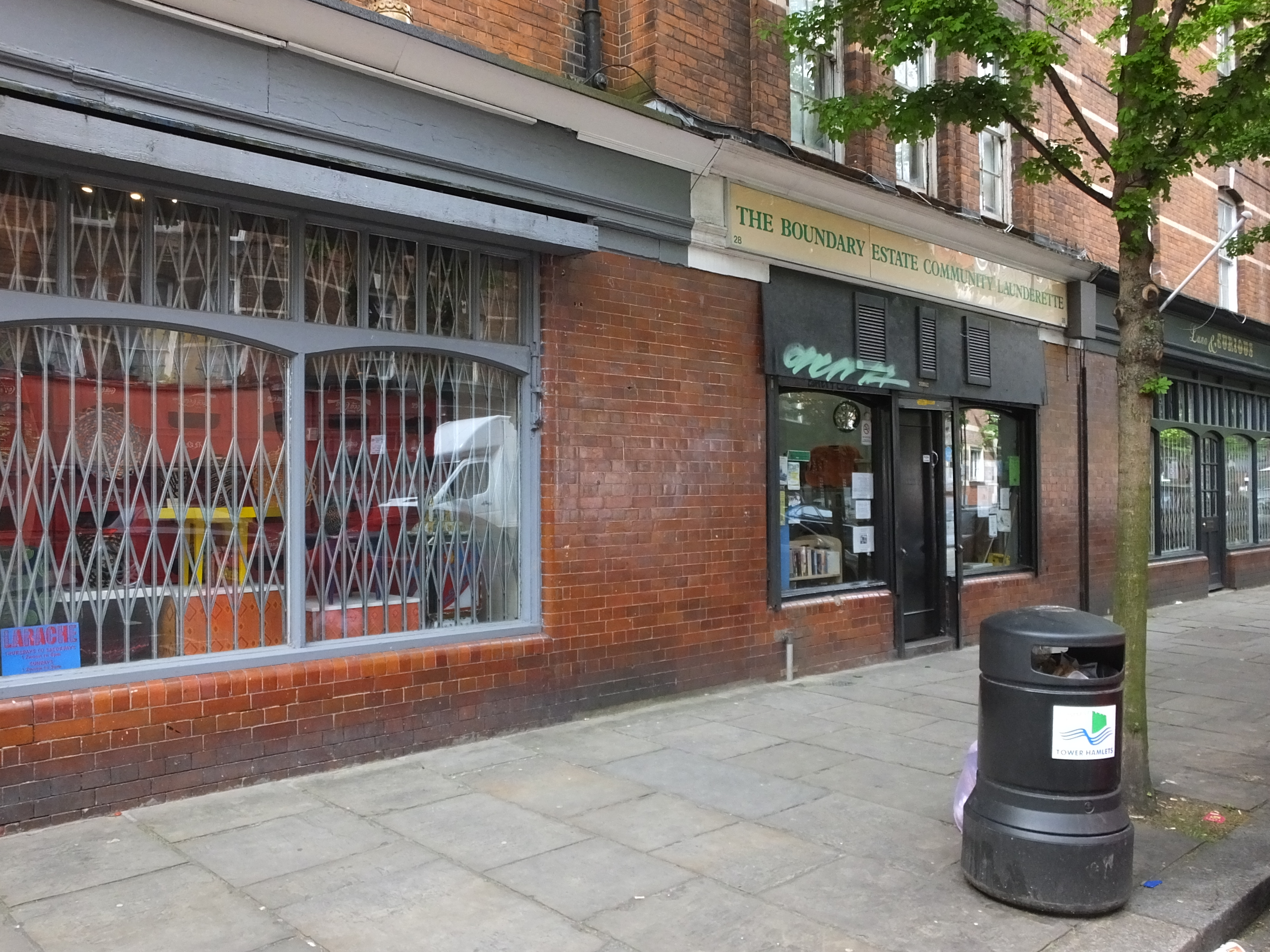
The Community Launderette, that forms a centre for community action.

The flats remain and are Grade II listed, together with the bandstand. In their day, they were revolutionary in providing facilities for residents. Today, despite the lack of modern amenities, they remain popular with tenants and have an active community.

=== Listed gardens ===
- Arnold Circus Gardens

=== Grade II listed buildings ===
- Bandstand at Boundary Street Garden, Arnold Circus.
  - Iron Railings and Overthrows at Boundary Street Garden, Arnold Circus
- 4–5 Virginia Road
- Marlow House, Arnold Circus: Built in 1899.
  - Marlow Workshops, Arnold Circus: Built in 1899.
- Virginia Primary School, Arnold Circus: London School Board design of 1875 with later alterations. A classic three-decker designed by E.H.Robson.
  - Area railings at nos. 35 to 49, Arnold Circus
- Chertsey House, Arnold Circus: Designed by Reginald Minton Taylor in 1895
- Sunbury House, Swanfield Street: built 1894-6 by C. C. Winmill.
  - Sunbury Workshops, Swanfield Street: designed by C.C. Winmill 1894
- Taplow House, Palissy Street: built 1894-6 by C. C. Winmill
- Hurley House, Arnold Circus
- Culham House, Rochelle Street: built 1894-6 by C. C. Winmill
- Sonning House, Swanfield Street: built 1894-6 by C. C. Winmill.
- Henley House, Swanfield Street: built 1894 by Roland Plumbe.
- Walton House, Montclare Street.
  - Iron Railings between Henley House and Walton House, Old Nichol Street.
- Cookham House, Montclare Street: a 1897 building by R. Minton Taylor, said to be built in a more mature style.
- Porters' House (former laundry), Montclare Street: this is the old laundry, as the blocks lacked washing facilities; however, no bath-house was provided. Built in 1894-6 by William Hynam.
- Sandford House, Arnold Circus: designed by R Minton Taylor in 1895/1896.
- Clifton House, Club Row
- Molesey House, Camlet Street
- Iffley House, Arnold Circus: Classically detailed and designed, 1896-8 by A. M. Phillips. The entrance is at the rear, leaving the facade free for a pair of broad windows to the ground floor in glazed brown brick.
- Laleham House, Camlet Street
- Hedsor House, Ligonier Street: one of four designs by C.C. Winmill, 1898
  - Iron railings, Gate and Gate Piers between Laleham House and Hedsor House, Old Nichol Street
- Benson House, Ligonier Street
- Abingdon House, Boundary Street: Built 1896-8 by A. M. Phillips. It had a conical tower.
- Wargrave House, Navarre Street: Built 1897 and designed by William Hynam
- Shiplake House, Arnold Circus: Built in 1897
- Walker House, 6–8 Boundary Street
- Rochelle Primary School, Arnold Circus
  - Rochelle Primary School Infants, Club Row
  - Rochelle Primary School House, Arnold Circus
  - Iron Railings at Rochelle Primary School, Arnold Circus
  - Playground Wall at Rochelle Primary School

Streatley Buildings were demolished in 1971. These were the first dwellings on the east side of the Boundary Estate. They were spartan, larger flats erected 1893-4.

=== Rochelle School ===
The 1870 Elementary Education Act made it compulsory for all children between the ages of five and twelve to be given a basic education at public expense. This was to be provided by board schools, and school boards were set up across the country to build and run these schools. It was estimated that 100,000 places would be required in London, a gross underestimation, and 500,000 had been provided by 1900. The architect who oversaw this was E. R. Robson, a student of George Gilbert Scott. The two school houses on the Rochelle campus, juniors and infants, were early examples of Robson's work.

The Rochelle School is now a community arts facility.

== Transport ==
The nearest London Overground station, Shoreditch High Street railway station, opened on 4 April 2010.
