= Belsize Fire Station =

Former fire station in the London Borough of Camden

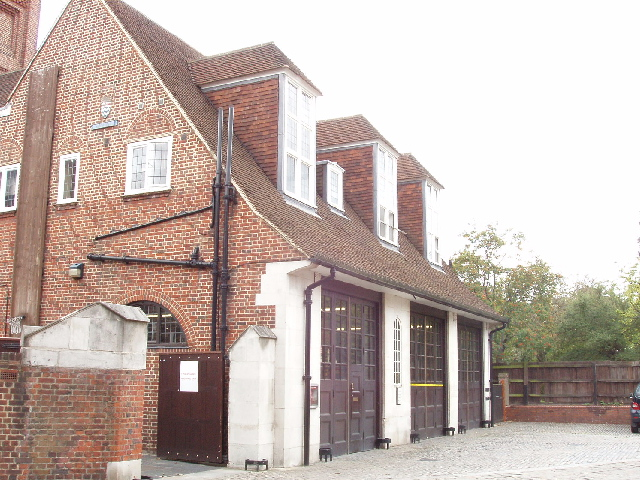
- Belsize Fire Station in 2005
- Interactive map of the Belsize Fire Station area

General information
- Status: Completed
- Type: Former fire station; Flats
- Architectural style: Arts and Crafts style
- Classification: Grade II*
- Location: Belsize Park, London Borough of Camden, London, United Kingdom
- Coordinates: 51.54534°N 0.16610°W
- Construction started: 1912

Technical details
- Material: Brick

Belsize Fire Station is a former fire station that is now used for private housing. Built between 1912 and 1915, it is a Grade II* listed building, and is situated in the London Borough of Camden. It is located at the junction between Eton Avenue and Lancaster Grove.

== History ==
Belsize Fire Station was designed by the architects Charles Winmill and Owen Fleming on behalf of London County Council, and built between 1912 and 1915 to replace a previous fire station in St John's Wood. It is built in Arts and Crafts style, in the style of an artist's studio. The building is made of brick with a flint roof, and contains glazed brick arches. The original building contained one bedroom apartments used to house firefighters, as well as a recreation room and separate billiard room.

Belsize Fire Station covers an area of 0.44 acres (19,000 ft^{2}). In 1974 it became a Grade II* listed building. The Fire Station was in London Fire Brigade zone A, which went as far as Westminster and Hammersmith. Fire crews from Belsize Fire Station were involved in the aftermath of the 1987 King's Cross fire, the 7 July 2005 London bombings, and a 2012 fire in the Taplow Block of flats.

The fire station was closed in 2014; it was one of nine fire stations in Greater London closed in that year due to budget cuts. In 2015, the building was sold for £20 million to an unknown buyer. In 2017, planning permission was given to convert Belsize Fire Station into 18 private flats, two of which had to be used for social housing. The social housing requirement was abandoned in 2020, and the building is now used for energy-efficient luxury flats. The price of the flats ranged from £750,000 to £1.7 million.
