= Primrose Hill Road =

Street in London

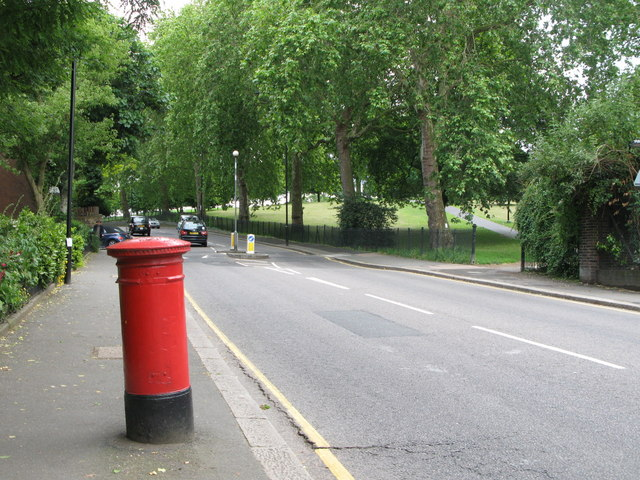
Stretch of road running by Primrose Hill.

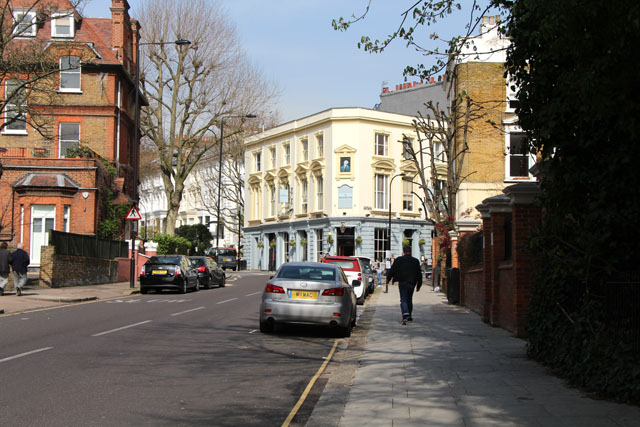
Northern stretch of street looking towards The Washington.

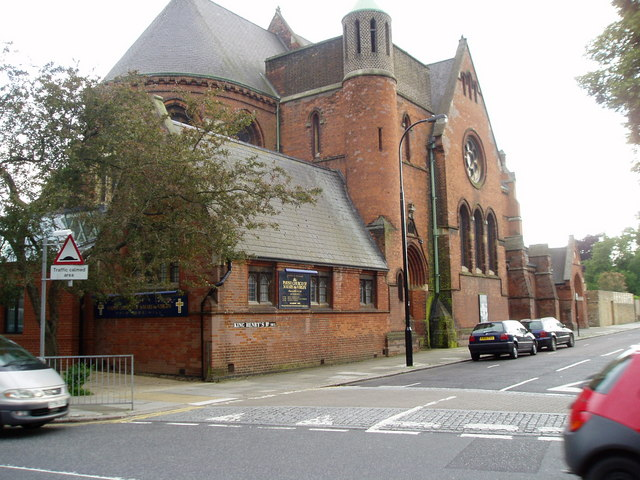
Church of St Mary.

Primrose Hill Road is a street located in the London Borough of Camden. Running off Regent's Park Road in the centre of the Primrose Hill area it heads west before curving northwards, following for some of its route alongside the edge of Primrose Hill. After crossing Adelaide Road it terminates next to The Washington pub in Belsize Park, at a junction with Eton Avenue, England's Lane and Belsize Park Gardens. Primrose Hill Tunnel carrying the West Coast Main Line passes underneath the street.

Part of the old Chalcot estate owned by Eton College, the street was laid out about 1862. While some of the original buildings still stand, others have been replaced over the decades. Notable residents have included the actor Fred Terry and Julia Neilson, the opera singer Adelina Patti and the writer Helen Waddell. The Gothic Church of St Mary the Virgin was constructed in 1872 and is now Grade II listed.

== Bibliography ==
- Bebbington, Gillian. London Street Names. Batsford, 1972.
- Cherry, Bridget & Pevsner, Nikolaus. London 4: North. Yale University Press, 2002.
- Thompson, Francis Michael Longstreth. Hampstead; Building a Borough, 1650-1964. Routledge & Kegan Paul, 1974.
- Wade, Christopher. The Streets of Belsize. Camden History Society, 1991.
