= Swiss Cottage Market =

Outdoor street market in Swiss Cottage, London

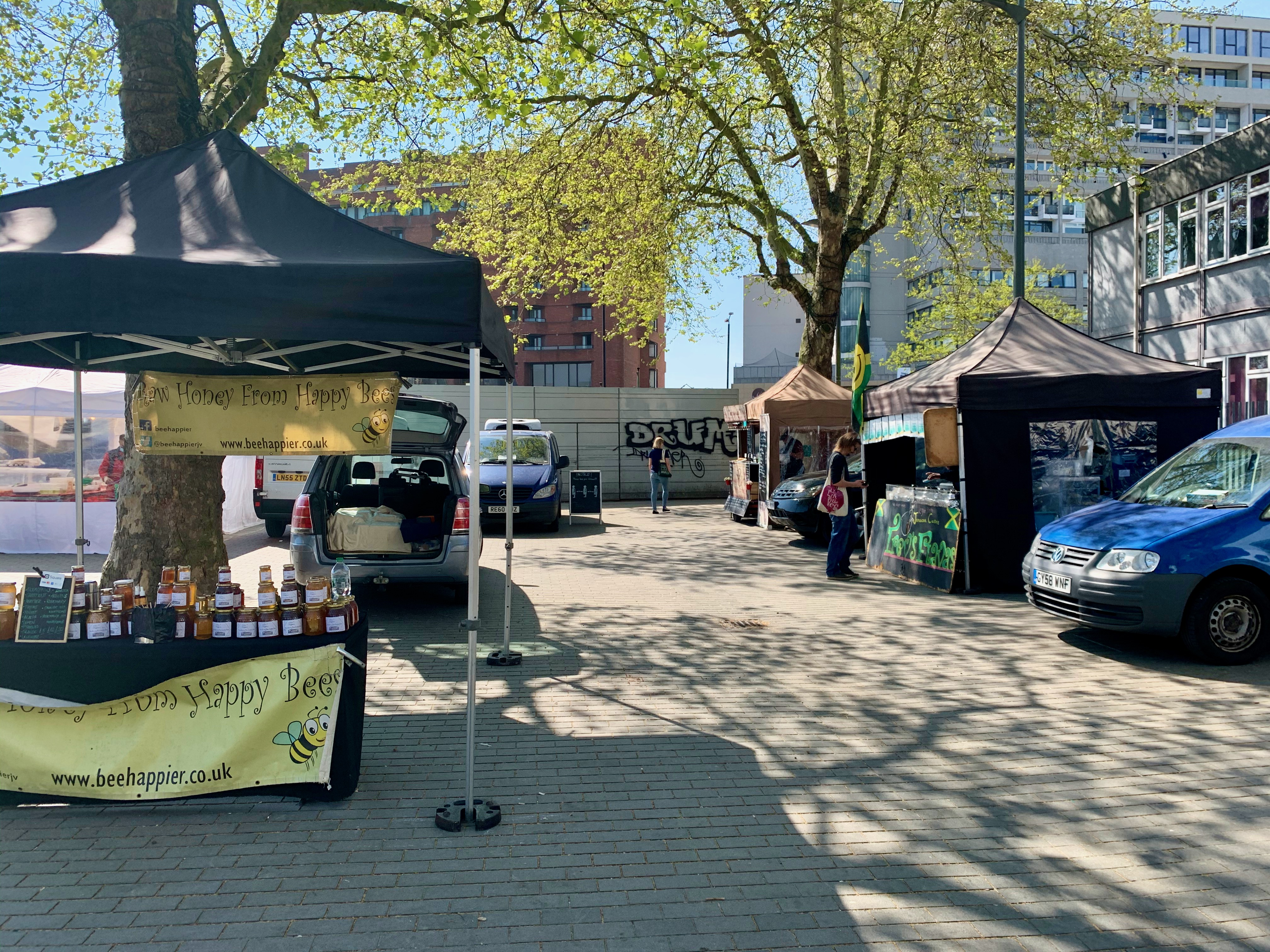
- Swiss Cottage Market, 15 April 2020
- Location: Eton Avenue, NW3; Swiss Cottage, Camden, Greater London; 51.543996°N 0.174022°W
- Opening date: 1974 (52 years ago)
- Management: Camden London Borough Council
- Owner: Camden London Borough Council
- Environment: Outdoor
- Goods sold: Food, Antiques (Fridays only)
- Days normally open: Tuesday to Saturday
- Website: camden.gov.uk/markets
- Location within London Borough of Camden

Swiss Cottage Market is an outdoor street market in Camden, North London. Licences to trade are issued by Camden London Borough Council.

== History ==
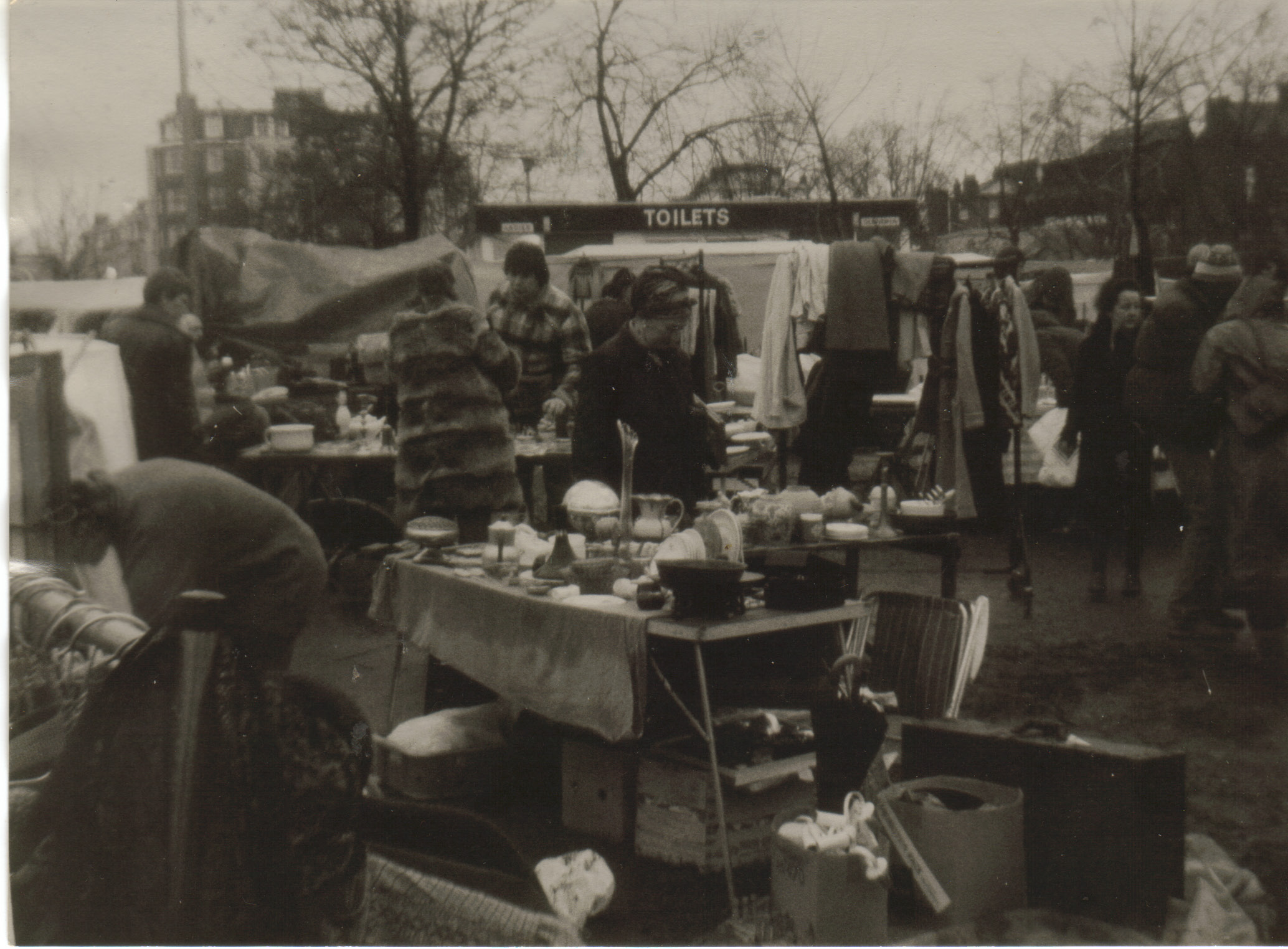
Swiss Cottage Market in 1980, David Howard

Swiss Cottage marked started in 1974 as an informal and unlicensed market in an area of derelict land owned by Camden Council next to the nearby junction of Eton Avenue and Winchester Road.

Forshaw describes a market selling homemade food, secondhand clothes and books as well as bric-à-brac and plants. At the end of 1981 the site was redeveloped and the market moved to a new location close to the sports centre.

Camden Council designated the pedestrianised western end of Eton Avenue as a street market from 1 July 2003 allowing Swiss Cottage Market and Swiss Cottage Farmers Market a permanent home. Swiss Cottage is the youngest of Camden's street markets and, from 2003 stalls, have been licensed and managed by Camden Council.

On Wednesdays the market hosts Swiss Cottage Farmers’ Market which is run by London Farmers’ Markets and started in 1999.

In November 2019 Prince Charles and his wife Camilla visited to mark the Farmers Market's twentieth anniversary. Prince Charles had visited the market once before in 2000.

== Transport ==
=== Bus ===
Bus Routes 13, 31, 46, 113, 187, 268, 603 and C11. Night bus routes N28, N31 and N113.

=== Railway and tube ===
The nearest underground station is Swiss Cottage. The nearest London Overground station is South Hampstead.
