= Eton Avenue =

Street in Hampstead, London

Coordinates: 51.54479°N 0.16851°W

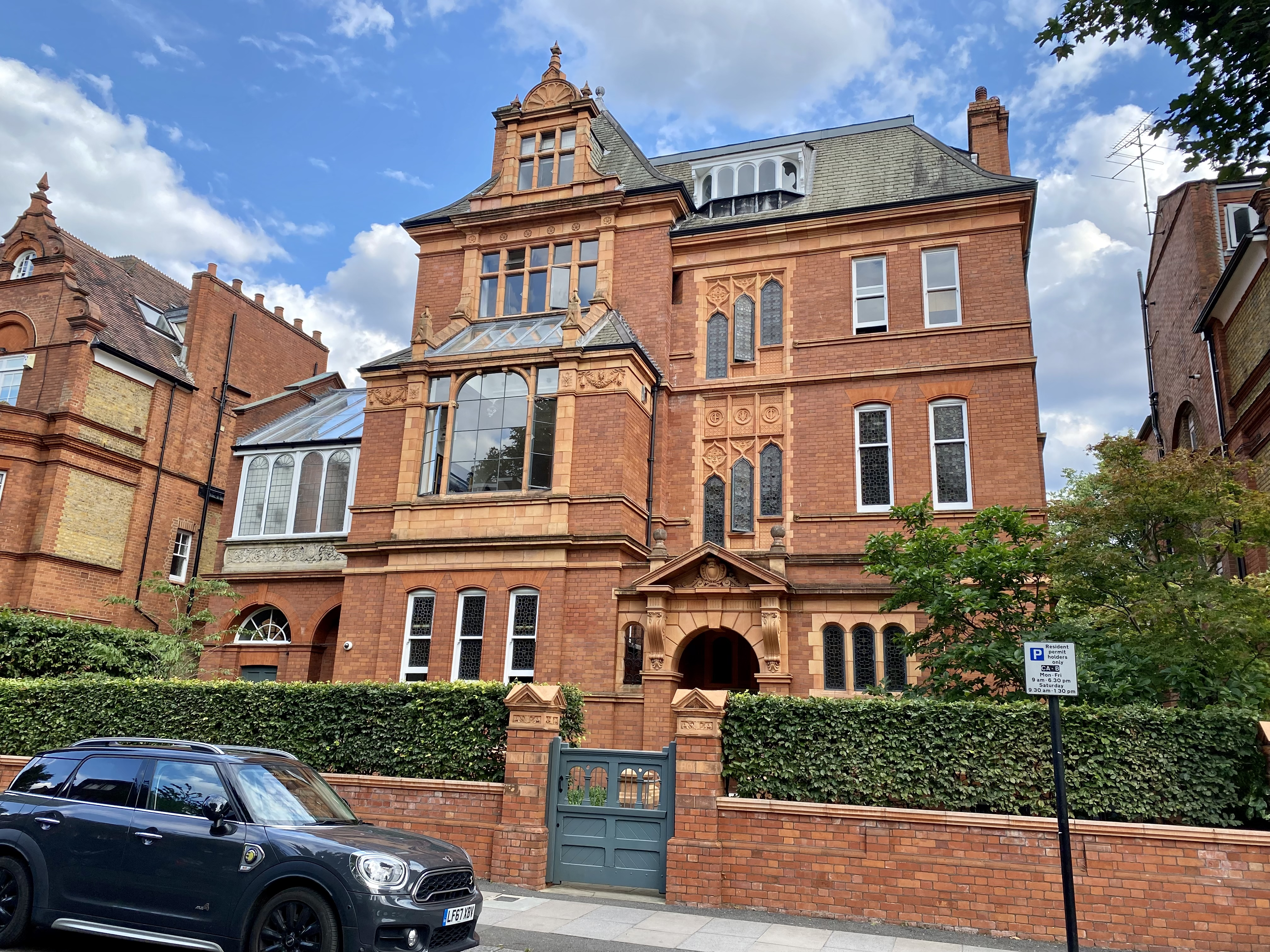
North House, Eton Avenue. Home of the Victorian artist John Collier.

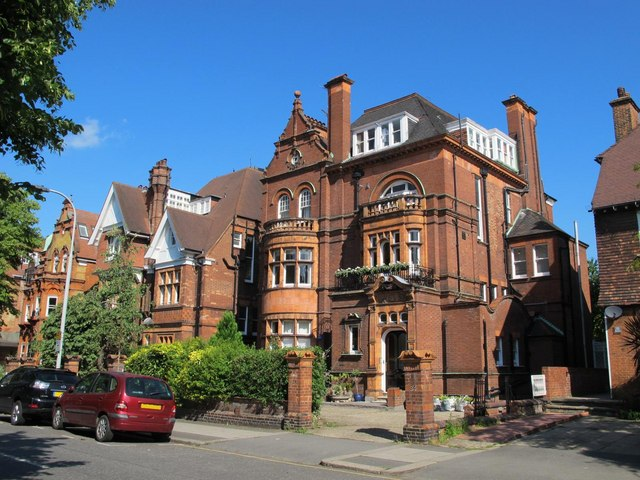
Characteristic redbrick houses.

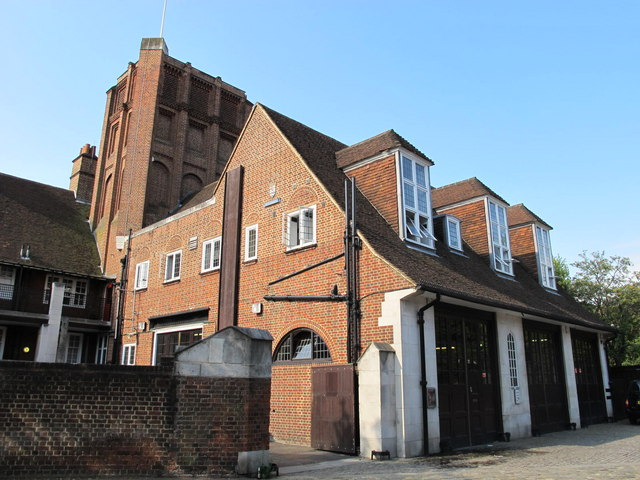
Belsize Fire Station in Eton Avenue.

Eton Avenue is a street in the Belsize Park area of Hampstead in North London. Located in the London Borough of Camden, it runs eastward from Swiss Cottage tube station to a junction with England's Lane, Primrose Hill Road and Belsize Park Gardens by The Washington pub. Fellows Road and Adelaide Road run parallel to the south of Eton Avenue.

Built in the late Victorian era by William Willett it features redbrick houses with terracotta and shaped gables, in contrast to the earlier white stucco Italianate style that dominates in the streets slightly to the north on the old Belsize House estate. Construction started around 1886. The street was laid out on the former Eton College estate, after which it takes it name. The western end is pedestrianised outside Hampstead Theatre and hosts the Swiss Cottage Market. The nearby Embassy Theatre uses the site of the former Hampstead Conservatoire.

Many buildings in the street are now listed. Amongst them is the Grade II*-listed Belsize Fire Station designed by Charles Winmill and built between 1912 and 1915.

== Bibliography ==
- Bebbington, Gillian. London Street Names. Batsford, 1972.
- Cherry, Bridget & Pevsner, Nikolaus. London 4: North. Yale University Press, 2002.
- Wade, Christopher. The Streets of Belsize. Camden History Society, 1991.
