= Masonic Temple (Atlanta) =

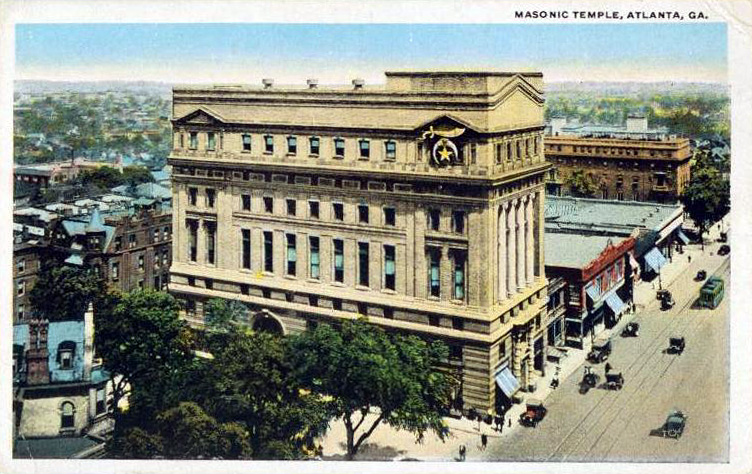
- Masonic Temple (circa 1915)

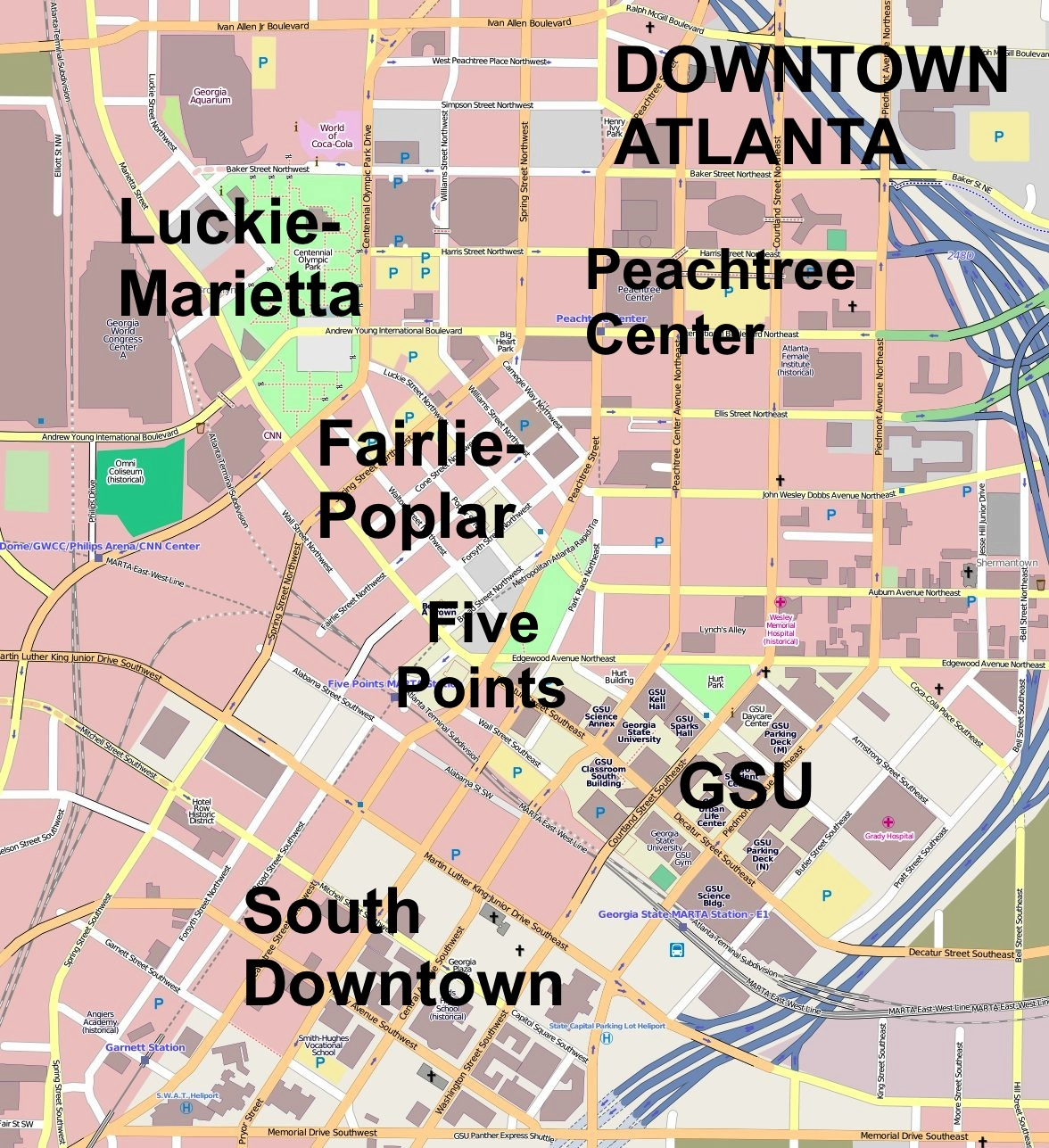
- Location within Downtown Atlanta Masonic Temple (Atlanta) (Atlanta) Masonic Temple (Atlanta) (Georgia) Masonic Temple (Atlanta) (the United States)

General information
- Location: 216 Peachtree Street NE; Atlanta, Georgia 30303
- Coordinates: 33.7598°N 84.3878°W
- Opened: February 22, 1909
- Destroyed: September 7, 1950

Height
- Height: 83 ft (25 m)

Technical details
- Floor count: 6

The Masonic Temple in Atlanta, Georgia was located at the northwest corner of Peachtree Street and Cain Street (now Andrew Young International Blvd.) in Downtown Atlanta from 1909-1950. The architect was John Robert Dillon.

== History ==
The building was dedicated on February 22, 1909. On September 7, 1950, a fire gutted the building. It was replaced by a parking structure which still stands today.
