= All Saints' Episcopal Church (Atlanta) =

- All Saints Episcopal Church
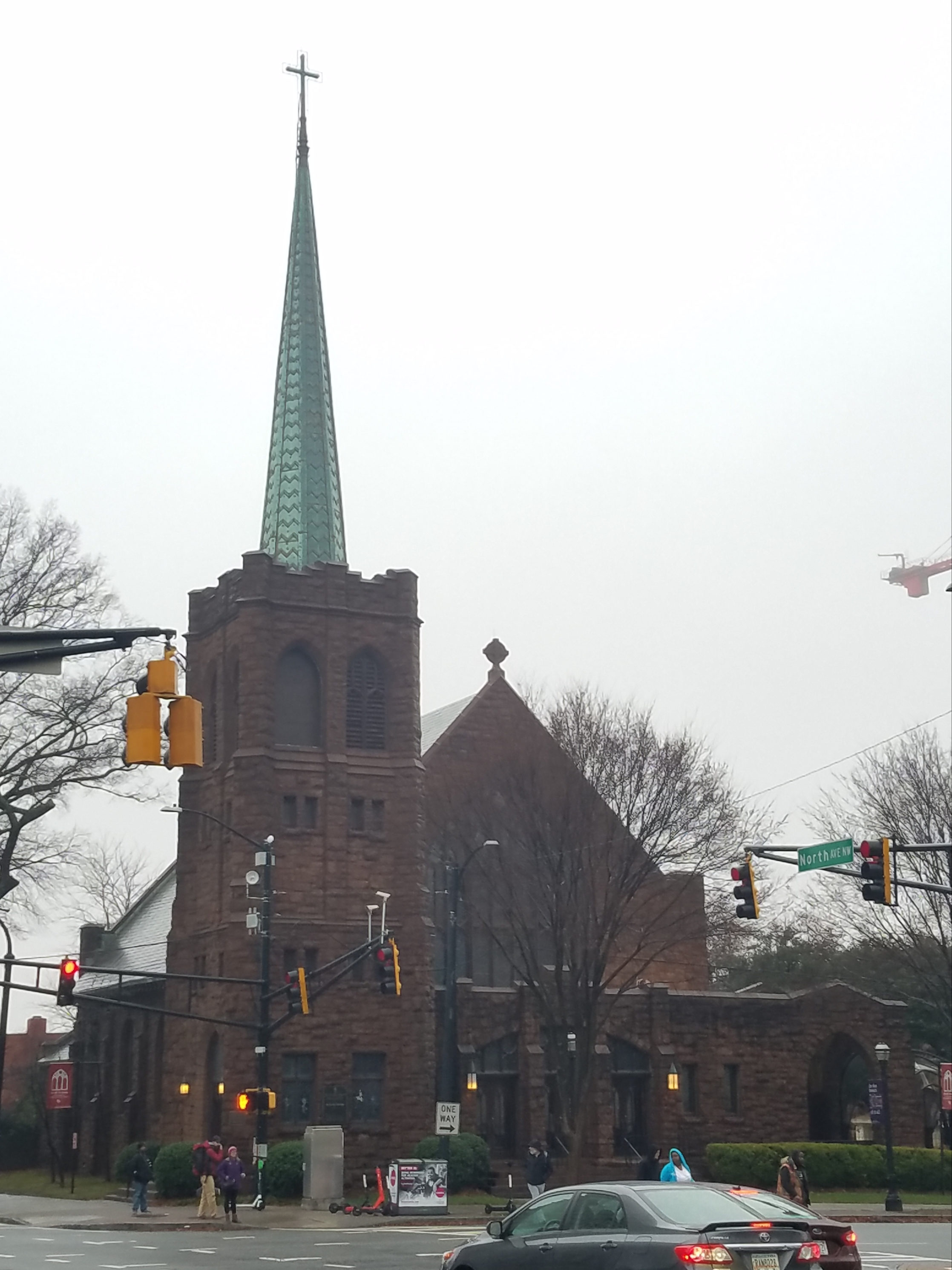
- All Saints' Episcopal Church (2019).

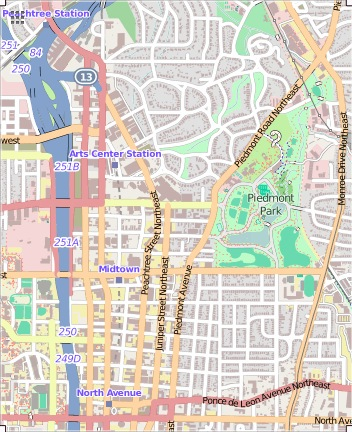
- Location within Atlanta Midtown Location within Atlanta Location within Georgia Location within the United States
- 33°46′17″N 84°23′16″W
- Location: 634 West Peachtree Street NW; Atlanta, Georgia 30308
- Denomination: Episcopal Church
- Website: allsaintsatlanta.org

History
- Founded: May 31, 1903
- Consecrated: December 9, 1908

Architecture
- Architect(s): Thomas Henry Morgan; John Robert Dillon
- Architectural type: Gothic
- Completed: April 8, 1906

Administration
- Province: Province IV
- Diocese: Episcopal Diocese of Atlanta

All Saints' Episcopal Church is an Episcopal church in Atlanta, Georgia. The church was founded in 1903, with the current building constructed in 1906.

In 2017, the church reported 2,808 members; in 2023, it reported 2,573 members. No membership statistics were reported in 2024 national parochial reports. Plate and pledge financial support reported by the church in 2023 was $3,491,613. Average Sunday Attendance (ASA) reported in 2024 was 427 persons. This was a relative decrease on ASA of 697 in 2016.

== History ==
In the early 1900s, Episcopalians in what is now midtown Atlanta petitioned the Episcopal Diocese of Georgia to establish a new church in midtown. During this time, the city of Atlanta was growing and expanding northward, and Episcopalians in the northern parts of the city wanted a place of worship closer to them than the churches in downtown Atlanta, which at the time included what would become the Episcopal Cathedral of Saint Philip. In 1901, Mary Jane Thompson Peters, the widow of prominent Atlanta businessman Richard Peters, donated land for the construction of a new church. This parcel, located at the intersection of North Avenue and West Peachtree Street, had previously been a part of Peters Park, a planned but never realized neighborhood in Atlanta that became much of the main campus of the Georgia Institute of Technology.

On April 11, 1903, a cornerstone for a church building at the site was placed, with Holy Communion first held at the church on May 31 of that year with 45 members. This building, a wooden structure, was designed by Harriett Dozier, one of the few women architects active at this time. In 1906, this building was demolished and replaced with a Gothic sandstone building. This building was designed by the architectural firm of Thomas Henry Morgan and John Robert Dillon. Service was first held in this building on April 8, 1906, and it was consecrated two years later on December 9, 1908. This current structure features several large stained glass windows, several of which are from Tiffany & Co.

In 1917, Egleston Hall was built adjacent to the church, primarily funded with a gift from the will of Thomas Egleston. According to Margaret Langford, the Tennessee quarry that produced the brown stones for the Church a decade earlier had to be reopened to retrieve matching stones for Egleston.^{:18} The hall was built in the style of the Akron Plan and built around what resembled an Elizabethan theater.^{:18} The hall has housed Sunday schools, offices and social activities like concerts and dances. Some notable gatherings in Egleston Hall have included the Women's Interracial Committee in 1932. In 1947, the 'Shakespearean' stage was removed and a library was added.^{:149} In 1971, the horseshoe room was added.^{:59}

In 1963, Ralph McGill joined All Saints' due to the Church's work with poor and disabled members of the community and for the support for the civil rights movement from its pastor at the time, Frank Ross.

In 2003, the church commissioned a new pipe organ from American-based John-Paul Buzard Pipe Organ Builders, the Opus 29. In 2020, American businesswoman and diplomat Anne Cox Chambers's funeral was held at All Saints'.

== Bibliography ==
- Allaback, Sarah (2008). The First American Women Architects. University of Illinois Press. ISBN 978-0-252-03321-6 – via Google Books.
- Brett, Jennifer (February 6, 2020). "'Thank you, Honey.' Atlanta gathers to remember Anne Cox Chambers". The Atlanta Journal-Constitution. Cox Enterprises.
- Garrett, Franklin M. (1969). Atlanta and Environs: A Chronicle of Its People and Events, 1880s-1930s. Vol. II. University of Georgia Press. ISBN 978-0-8203-3904-7 – via Google Books.
- MacDougald, Louise Black (December 1947). "My Seventh Move". Atlanta Historical Bulletin. VIII (32). Atlanta Historical Society – via Atlanta History Center.
- Martin, Harold H. (1987). Atlanta and Environs: A Chronicle of Its People and Events, 1940s-1970s. Vol. III. University of Georgia Press. ISBN 978-0-8203-3906-1 – via Google Books.
