= Belsize Park Gardens =

Street in Hampstead, London

Coordinates: 51.548°N 0.167°W

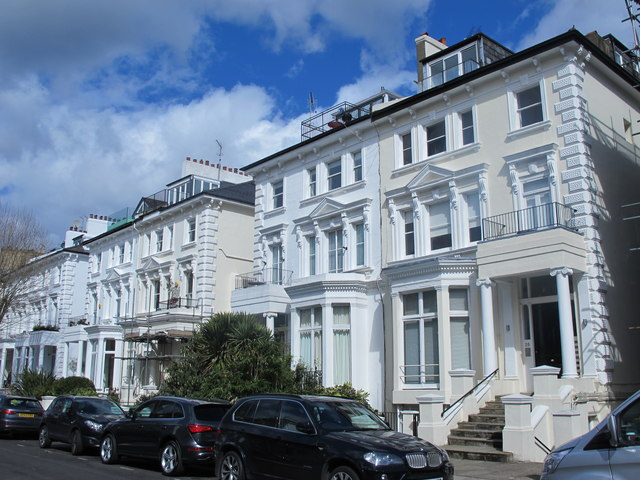
Victorian white stucco houses occupy most of the street.

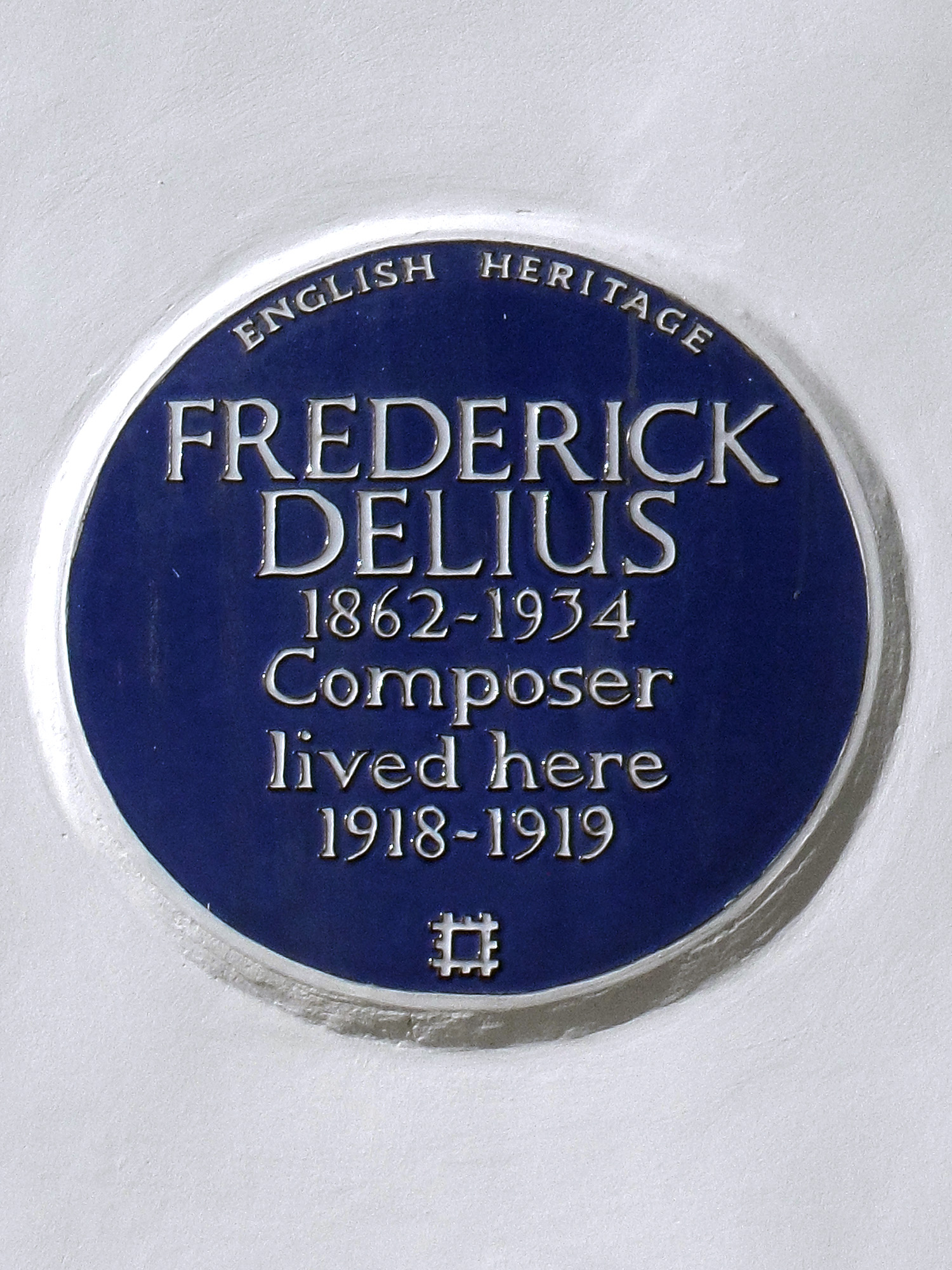
Blue plaque commemorating Frederick Delius.

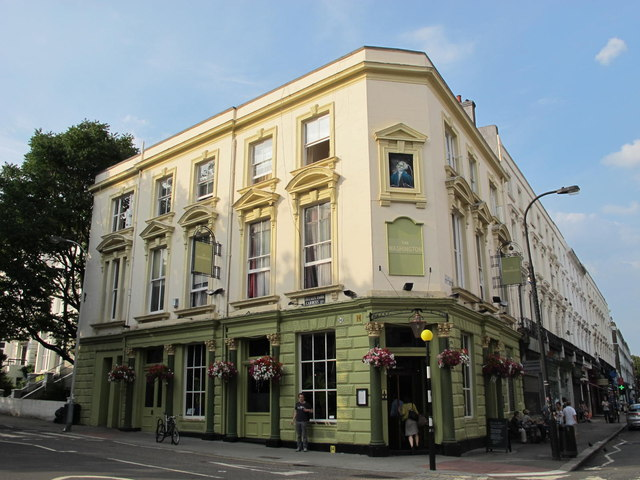
The Washington pub.

Belsize Park Gardens is a street in the Belsize Park area of Hampstead in London. Located in the London Borough of Camden, it is residential street featuring white stucco Victorian era buildings. It runs roughly southeastwards from Belsize Avenue in Belsize Village before terminating at a junction with Eton Avenue, England's Lane and Primrose Hill Road. The Grade II listed pub The Washington, dating from around 1865, is located at its eastern end.

The area was laid out in the mid-nineteenth century as prosperous housing to provide for the expanding population of the capital. The Italianate stucco style resembled similar new neighbourhoods in Kensington. From 1855 the property developer Daniel Tidey directed the development of the street, described by Pevsner as "the most impressive stretch" notable for its paired palazzi with ionic porches. It is built on the land of the former Belsize House estate from which it takes its name, along with various other streets in the vicinity. Notable former residents included the composer Frederick Delius and the journalist Henry Noel Brailsford, both of whom are now commemorated with blue plaques.

== See also ==
- Belsize Lane, nearby street

== Bibliography ==
- Bebbington, Gillian. London Street Names. Batsford, 1972.
- Cherry, Bridget & Pevsner, Nikolaus. London 4: North. Yale University Press, 2002.
- Wade, Christopher. The Streets of Belsize. Camden History Society, 1991.
