= John Robert Dillon =

American architect

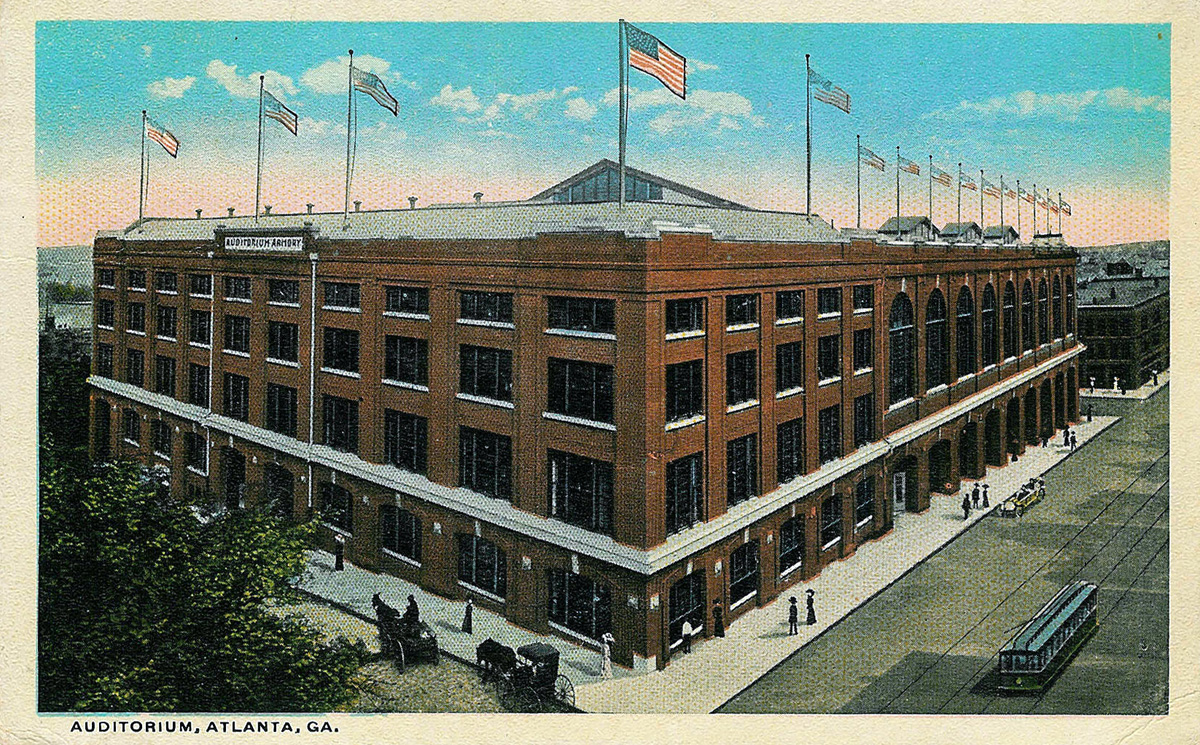
Atlanta Municipal Auditorium with original brick facade

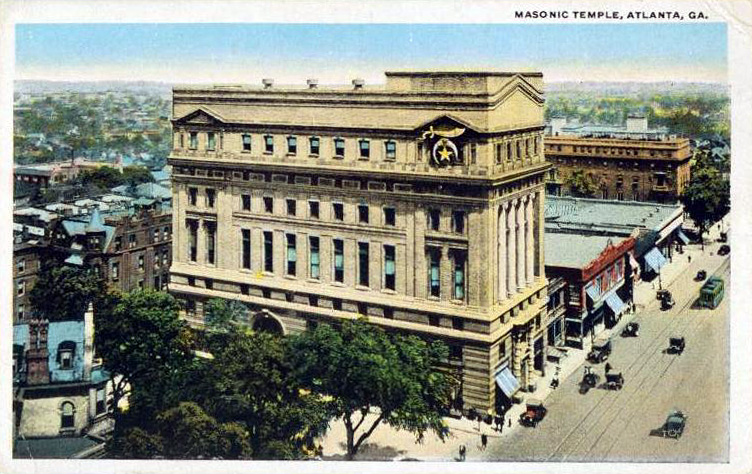
Masonic Temple, Atlanta 1909-1950

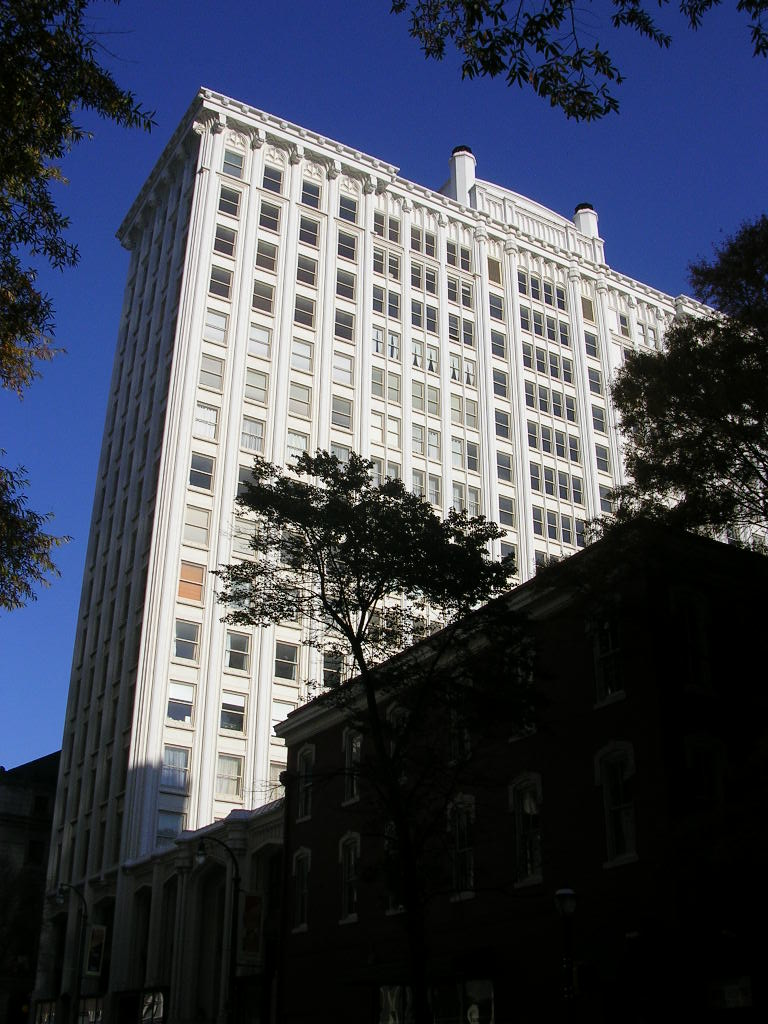
Healey Building

John Robert Dillon (1872—1948) was an architect active in Atlanta, Georgia. He became associated with the Bruce and Morgan firm in 1903, which became Morgan and Dillon in 1904. A graduate of Northwestern School of Architecture, he was named a Fellow in the American Institute of Architects in 1948.

His works include:

- Early County Courthouse (1904–05)
- Georgia Railway and Power Building (1904–7)
- Healey Building (1913)
- Masonic Temple (Atlanta)
- Municipal Auditorium (Atlanta, Georgia), now the GSU Alumni Hall
- All Saints' Episcopal Church (Atlanta)
- Oglethorpe University - some buildings
- University of Chicago - some buildings
- Grant Estate. Now Cherokee Town Club
- Lena Swift Huntley Residence (wife of Charles Thomas Swift)
- Retail Credit Company Building
