= The Washington, Belsize Park =

Pub in Belsize Park, London

Coordinates: 51°32′44″N 0°09′46″W

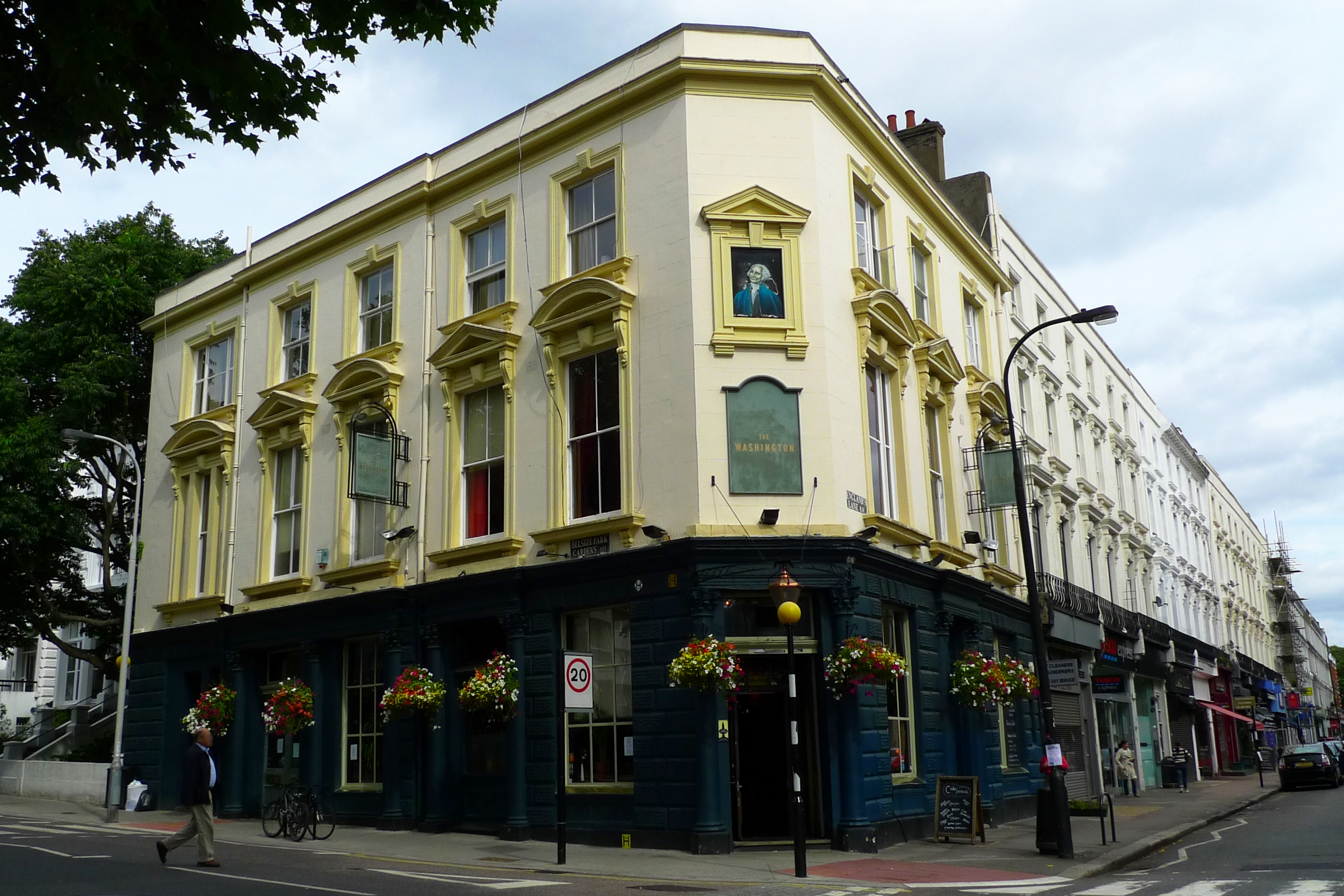
The Washington

The Washington is a Grade II listed public house at 50 England's Lane, Belsize Park, London. It is located at the junction between Eton Avenue, England's Lane, Primrose Hill Road, Belsize Park Gardens. It was built in about 1865 by the developer Daniel Tidey.
