= Walton Place (Atlanta) =

Coordinates: 33.7562°N 84.3915°W

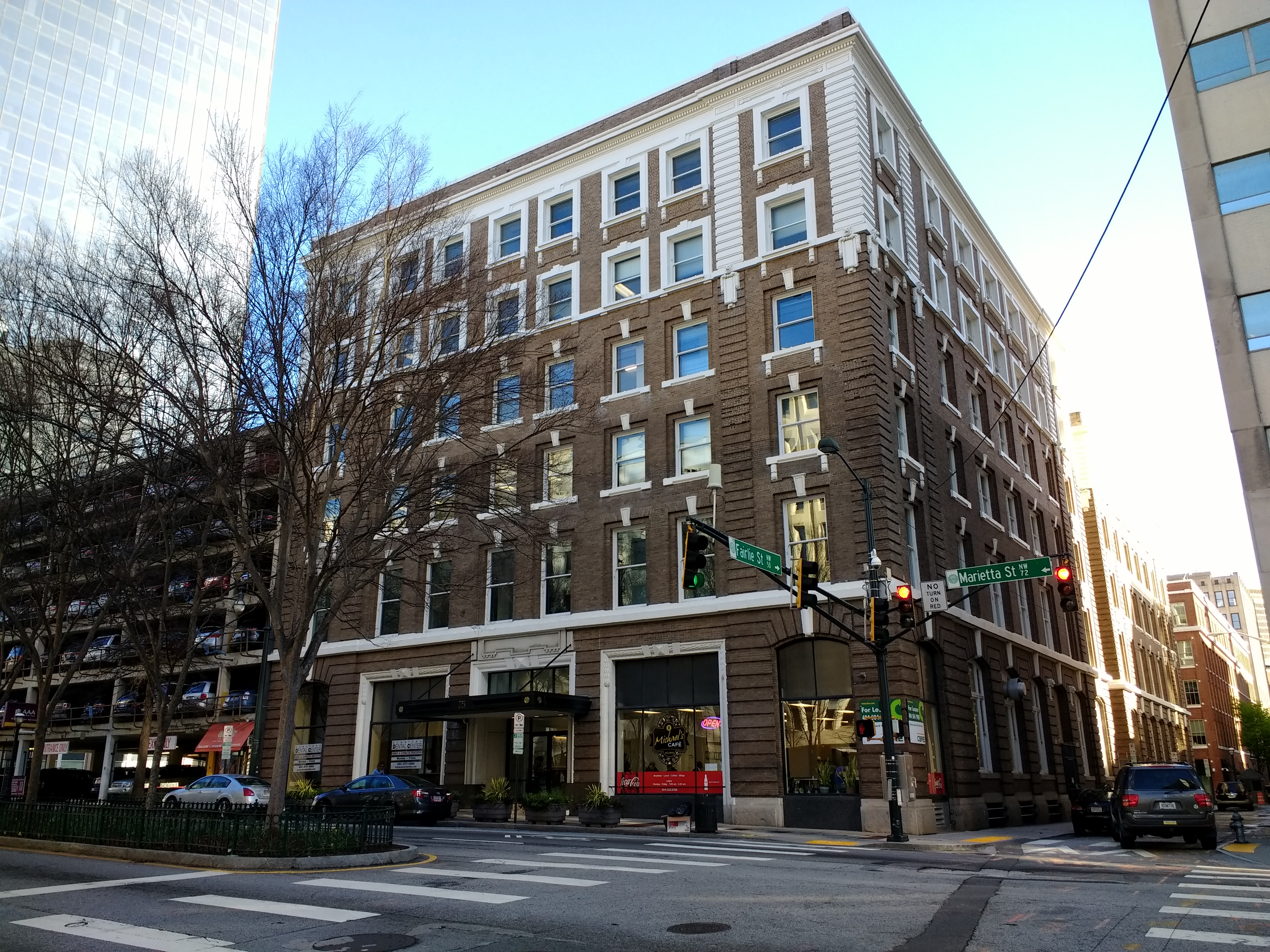
Walton Place

Walton Place is a historic 1907 building at 75 Marietta Street in downtown Atlanta, Georgia. It was originally the Georgia Railway and Power Building. The architect was John Robert Dillon. Restoration took place in 1988.
