= Owen Fleming =

London architect (1867-1955)

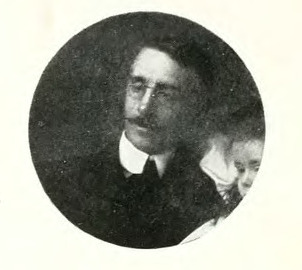
- Born: 27 July 1867; Southsea
- Died: 1955 (aged 87–88); Sevenoaks

Owen Fleming (1867–1955) was an architect based in London. He is noted for being the principal architect for London County Council (LCC), leading the New Housing of the Working Classes Department within the LCC between 1889 and 1900. He was the lead architect with Charles Winmill of 16 Basil Street, a purpose built fire station in Knightsbridge.

Fleming was also responsible for over seeing the Boundary Gardens Scheme, which set a precedent for future council estates. They designed decorative flats that were not simply regimented, with varying size of windows, small doors and roofs with attractive gables. "The Eastender deserves better that that", wrote Fleming referring to the average build in Shoreditch.
