= Charles Winmill =

English architect

Charles Canning Winmill, FRIBA
- Born: 14 January 1865; Plaistow, East London, England
- Died: 11 January 1945 (aged 79); Essex, England
- Occupation: Architect
- Practice: LCC, SPAB, private commissions
- Buildings: Belsize Fire Station (Grade II*), All Saints' Parish Hall (locally listed)

Charles Canning Winmill FRIBA (14 January 1865 – 11 January 1945) was an English architect working in the Arts and Crafts style during the late 19th and early 20th centuries. He spent much of his career in the London County Council's architects' department, before retiring early to focus on private work. He was a long-term active member of the Society for the Protection of Ancient Buildings, from 1898 onwards. He joined the Art Workers' Guild in 1917, served on the committee from 1927 to 1929, and helped to organise meetings and trips. He became a Fellow of the Royal Institute of British Architects in the late 1920s.

== Early life and education ==
Charles Winmill was born at his parents' home in Balaam Street, Plaistow, East London, on 14 January 1865. His father was William Hill Winmill of West Ham, and his mother was Fanny Sarah (née Mumford) of Henham, Essex (they were married at St Mary's Church, Plaistow, on 7 November 1863). A second son, Hallett, was born in 1867, and the family moved to Forest Gate. They moved again in the autumn of 1868, to The Elms, Gorleston, Norfolk, from where they had a view of the sea (William's profession was connected with fishing boats and ships). William was injured in an accident in early 1869 and died in Yarmouth Hospital on 15 April. His widow gave birth to a third son, William, on 28 July 1869, and soon after this she took her three sons with her to live with an elderly aunt in the village of Newport, in her home county of Essex.

In about 1870 the family moved to Augusta Villa, Ramsgate, Kent, where Fanny ran a girls' boarding and day school: she was a good artist and taught drawing. Around this time Charles enjoyed going on country walks, looking at old buildings and ruins, which led to an early interest in architecture. In 1875 he attended Christ's Hospital School in the City of London, which he found a rather tough environment: he was good at drawing, but disliked exams. In 1880 he went for a year to Wenbigh Grammar School in Thornton Heath, where the headmaster, a Reverend T. H. Roberts, described the young Charles as 'perverse to the last'.

In early 1881, Winmill's mother arranged his first employment, in the manifest department at Millwall Docks, where he earned 10 shillings per week. From 17 January 1881, in order to be near to his work, he lodged with an elderly Frenchman at 81 Blackheath Hill, in south-east London, a tall red-brick house. The following year, Fanny gave up her school in Ramsgate and moved to Greenwich, so that all three of her sons could live with her. On dark winter mornings Charles taught his younger brother Hallett to cycle on a 52" Excelsior bicycle on Blackheath. In the mid-1880s, Charles joined the Artists' Rifles as a volunteer, and served for five years as a private; during manoeuvres on Wimbledon Common he once took a 'prisoner' who turned out to be the young Winston Churchill, about twelve years old at the time.

== Professional work ==
=== Early training ===
In about 1884 Winmill was articled to John T. Newman of 2 Fenchurch Court, an architect and surveyor to the West Ham Board. Winmill learned a great deal from Newman, at the same time attending evening classes in design at the Architectural Association, at 9 Conduit Street. The Architectural Association's motto was 'Design with Beauty, Build in Truth', a concept which Winmill took to heart and followed throughout his career. In 1888 he left Newman's practice to become assistant to Leonard Stokes, a leading Roman Catholic architect with premises at 7 Storeys Gate, Westminster. During these early years, Winmill became strongly influenced by the Arts and Crafts Movement, led by the writer and designer William Morris and the architect Philip Webb, other architectural and design influences including William Richard Lethaby and Charles Voysey. Winmill remained with Stokes for four years, until moving on to the London County Council, where he was to spend the larger part of his career.

=== London County Council (LCC) ===
Winmill worked for the London County Council for 31 years, from 1892 to 1923. He worked in the architects' department, where he was responsible mainly for social housing and fire stations. In the early days he was based at the old LCC offices in Spring Gardens, London SW1. The first building he designed for the LCC was a row of cottages in Goldsmith's Row, Hackney, East London. Other schemes he was involved in included slum clearance and replanning of part of Shoreditch, as well as work in Bethnal Green and the Tabard Street area of Southwark.

A large part of Winmill's work was for the LCC's fire brigade section, under the leadership of Robert Pearsall. On 19 November 1897 there was a serious fire in Cripplegate, during which warehouses were destroyed, and it was decided that a new fire station was needed for the area. Winmill was put in charge, and the Red Cross Street fire station was completed in 1900, with its formal opening taking place on 23 February 1901. In December 1899 Winmill had become second in command of the LCC fire brigade section, helping to implement a five-year plan to double the number of fire stations in London, with a target of six per year. Another responsibility was the annual inspection of all London fire stations, during which he would note any requirements for alterations and additions.

His LCC work was very demanding during the First World War, as the fire brigade section was very short-staffed. Around this time an innovation from America was the installation of sliding poles in fire stations, replacing staircases. Another was the gradual replacement of horses by motorised engines. All of these changes required design changes to the fire station buildings. To coordinate this, Winmill worked well with the London Fire Brigade's Chief Officer, Sir Sampson Sladen. He also got on well with the politicians John Burns, a leading LCC council member and MP, and George Lansbury, a Poplar council member and MP.

In 1913 work on the new LCC County Hall building began; progress was slow because of the First World War, but Winmill moved into his new office there in around 1919, and the building was formally opened in 1922. In April 1919 Winmill had been promoted to 'principal assistant' and became head of his section, but he was less happy because of the shift of focus to administrative work. Then, in January 1923, an early retirement opportunity arose, and he was pleased to retire from the LCC at the end of September in order to concentrate on private commissions and his ongoing SPAB activities.

=== Society for the Protection of Ancient Buildings (SPAB) ===
The SPAB was formed to counteract what was regarded as destructive 19th century practices in the restoration of heritage buildings, including the scraping of ancient plaster off walls, and the romantic trend of allowing ivy to grow on buildings. Winmill joined the Society in 1898 and later served on the committee. He was on friendly terms with Philip Webb and Richard Lethaby, and did valuable work for the organisation throughout his career, contributing to the inspection, maintenance and repair of many medieval (and medieval style) buildings, especially churches, including:

- St Augustine's Abbey (school roof), Ramsgate, Kent (now Grade II listed)
- St Mary Stratford atte Bowe (saved from destruction)
- Chingford Old Church, Essex (saved from destruction)
- St Margaret's Church, Barking, Essex (now Grade I listed)
- St Lawrence's Church, Aylesby, Lincolnshire (including a design for a font cover and a design for a prayer desk)

Other buildings he visited were in Chard (Somerset), the Isle of Caldey (South West Wales), and Lundy Island (North Devon). His main criteria in this valuable work were craftsmanship and simplicity.

His work on St Mary Stratford atte Bowe (a medieval church famous for being mentioned in the General Prologue of Chaucer's Canterbury Tales) was especially significant: he co-wrote a report on its restoration with Webb, Lethaby and others in 1900, helped supervise the work, and saved the building from destruction.

His detailed survey of St Margaret's Church, Barking, written in 1928, illustrates his professional attention to detail, his practical advice on finding the right builder, and the order in which the work should be carried out. He also shows his consideration for the feelings of the church's clergy and congregation who might be unhappy at his suggestions. He gives an overall estimate of costs for the renovation works (£1375), and mentions other items for later attention, including organ maintenance, gutters, heating, lighting, tower, walls, altar and altar rails.

Continuing into his later life he advised SPAB on repairs to ancient buildings in Kent and Essex, and undertaking occasion architectural work, although by 1939 he was expressing his sadness about new trends that were doing damage to old buildings. According to Francis C Eeles, Secretary of the Central Council for the Care of Churches, Winmill steered a course between ensuring practical repairs while retaining as much of the original building as possible. Eeles states that Winmill did excellent work in bringing the old church at Chingford back into use when some people thought that it was beyond recovery and might be lost entirely. As an advisor for the Society in Essex and Kent, Winmill was able to promote good practice, and Eeles feels that Winmill himself being a churchman gave his work added meaning and sincerity. (Indeed, Winmill's daughter notes that in July 1944 her father disapproved of a stained glass window containing the words 'to the Glory of God' when it also had the sponsoring family's name displayed on it.) A similar assessment to that of Eeles came from a satisfied client, the Abbot of St Augustine's, Ramsgate, where Winmill advised on and supervised repairs to the Abbey school roof in 1934: the Abbot found Winmill to be a straightforward person of integrity, honesty and kindness, showing attention to detail in his work, and with a sense of humour.

=== Private work ===
An early private project which Winmill undertook while still with the LCC was for a 'House and Home' exhibition at the Whitechapel Art Gallery in the summer of 1911, organised by Philip Webb. The exhibits included examples of modern housing and 'homes of the past', for which Winmill created a full-sized model of the lower floor of a small house. A later exhibition project came in 1924, when he was involved in the planning of the 1888 room at the Palace of Arts (designed by Philip Webb), for the British Empire Exhibition at Wembley.

From about 1923 onwards, for about 20 years, Winmill did private work for Dent publishers, maintaining, adapting and extending the company's printing and binding works at Letchworth, Hertfordshire, as well as their office building in London. Another commission in Letchworth was for a canteen at the Temple Press (an imprint of Dent), the opening of which he attended in December 1944.

Winmill also designed homes for friends, for example two houses in West Street, Reigate, Surrey in 1923, in Merriott, Somerset in 1924, and 88 Ossulton Way, Finchley, North London, a four-bedroom detached house completed in 1934.

=== Notable buildings ===
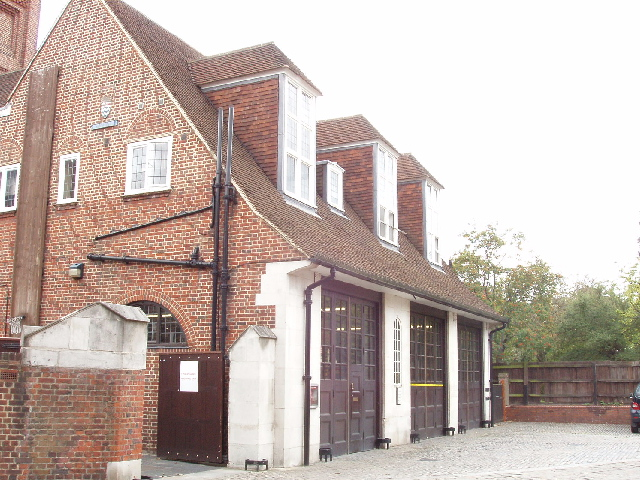
Belsize Fire Station, Belsize Park, London, designed by Charles Canning Winmill, opened in 1915.

==== Belsize Fire Station ====
Formerly known as St John's Wood Fire Station, Winmill designed the Belsize Fire Station as part of his work for the LCC. It is in Arts and Crafts style, with leaded rectangular windows, four lunette-shaped windows, various dormer windows set into the roof, tall chimneys, and a medieval-romanesque-style tower. Construction began in 1912 and the building opened in 1915. Located between Eton Avenue and Lancaster Grove NW3 in the London Borough of Camden, north-west London, Belsize Fire Station has been a Grade II* listed building since 1974. Originally designed and built for the London Fire Brigade, it provided residential accommodation for firefighters in a separate building in the style of a Kentish farmhouse. It closed as a fire station in 2014, and was converted to 'luxury apartment' residential use, now known as Belsize Park Firehouse.

==== All Saints' Parish Hall ====
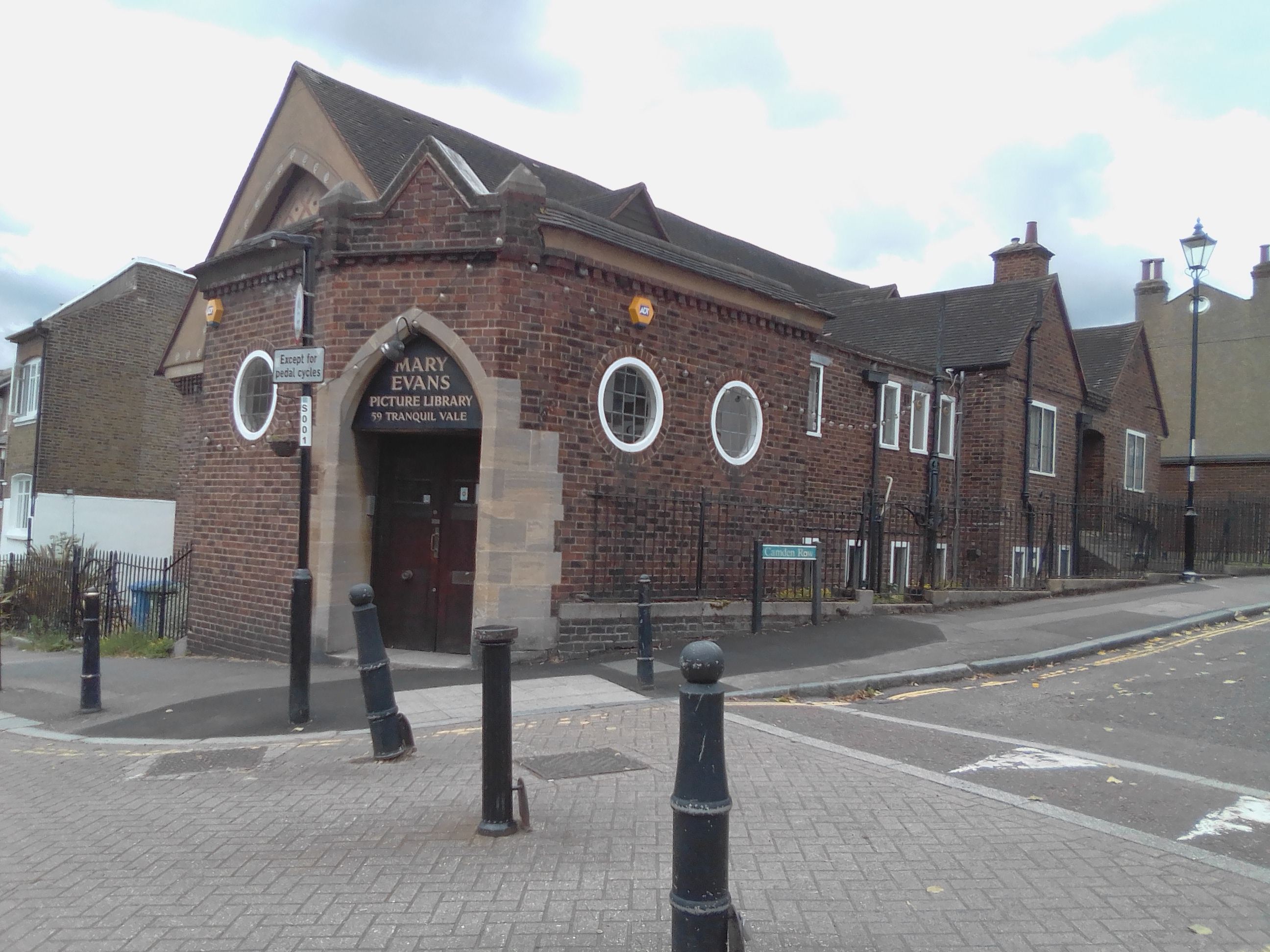
All Saints' Parish Hall, Blackheath, London, designed by Charles Canning Winmill, opened in 1928.

This building was a private commission for All Saint's Church, Blackheath, south-east London. At that time Winmill was living at 2 Eliot Place, Blackheath, and was attending the church. Construction work took place from 1927 to 1928, and the building was officially opened by Princess Marie Louise of Schleswig-Holstein (1872–1956), granddaughter of Queen Victoria, on 3 November 1928. Located in Tranquil Vale SE3, in the London Borough of Lewisham, within the Blackheath conservation area, All Saints' Parish Hall is a locally listed building in Arts and Crafts style, with leaded rectangular windows in groups of three or four, deep windowsills on the interior and carefully designed metal window catches, three circular leaded windows on either side of the entrance door (one on the left, two on the right), dormer windows at roof level, and decorative mosaic-style design work on the front façade. It has had many uses over the years, both by the church itself and the local community, and has been the business premises of the Mary Evans Picture Library since late 1988.

==== Cherry Tree Public House ====
Winmill designed this public house, in Wood Lane, Dagenham, Essex, including the swinging sign outside, in 1929. The building was designed with F.G. Newnham, architect for the brewers Barclay Perkins & Co, during LCC's development of the Becontree estate. It is a solid, symmetrical building with Georgian-style windows, an entrance porch, and dormer windows set into the roof.

== Travel in the UK and overseas ==
Winmill visited a number of heritage locations, both in the UK and overseas, which would have influenced his architectural style. In the UK around the turn of the century he visited Kelmscott Manor in the Cotswolds, made famous as the home of William Morris, and he was lucky enough to be shown round the house by Morris's widow. Around the same time he visited Oxford, where he saw a tapestry by Morris and Burne-Jones, Adoration of the Magi, as well as Holman Hunt's painting, The Light of the World. During part of the First World War the Winmill family stayed at Tunbridge Wells, Kent, in an old house on the Pantiles, from where he could visit the architect Philip Webb in Sussex, riding on a 'motor bicycle'. Another architect friend was Walter Shirley, who became 11th Earl Ferrers in 1911, and later went to live at the family seat at Staunton Harold, Leicestershire, where Winmill went to visit. Winmill also made about three holiday trips to the Scilly Isles, his last visit being in March 1935.

He also visited a number of European countries, specifically to look at examples of architecture. For example around the turn of the century he went on a trip to Bruges, where he took time to sketch old buildings. He also had a holiday in northern Italy, where he visited Venice, Padua and Verona. In the late 1920s he made short trips to Paris and Dieppe, and in 1929 he made a longer trip to see the chateaux of the Loire, visiting Blois, Chartres, Loches, Chinon, Amboise and Tours. In the spring of 1937 he went on a trip to Greece, which included the Greek islands and Cyprus.

== Private life ==
Winmill met his future wife, Anne Mary Dyer (1860-1956), during a family visit to St Albans in the late 1860s, when both of them were children. Soon after Winmill's mother died (19 January 1901), Charles and Anne became engaged. They married on 31 August 1901 (in Steyning, Sussex), and their daughter Joyce Mary, an only child, was born on 15 July 1903 (in Bexleyheath, Kent).

Winmill lived in various locations in adult life. After a time at Woodford, Essex, in the early years of the 20th century, the family moved to Bexleyheath, Kent, to a small house named Grasmere, designed by Winmill himself. Then in 1904 they moved to nearby Nelson House, 114 Broadway, Bexleyheath, where he had previously lived for five years with his mother. In the mid to late 1920s he was back in Blackheath, where he had lived in his early apprenticeship days - his address was 2 Eliot Place, with a view across the heath, in a building described by his daughter as a "tall, gaunt, haunted old house" which had previously served as a boarding school, St Piran's, with at least one famous former pupil, Benjamin Disraeli, who studied there for about five years in the 1810s. During these years in Blackheath, Winmill and his daughter took part in local folk dancing and country dancing activities, going to weekly classes in Greenwich for about two years; they also went to parties organised by the Blackheath Music Society. One folk dancing party had 250-300 people taking part. In 1923 the family of three attended an English Folk Dance Society summer school at Aldeburgh, Suffolk (as non-dancing students); activities included the singing of traditional songs, sea shanties, carols, lectures by the folklorist and song collector Cecil Sharp, dance parties at Alde House, as well as demonstrations of sword, morris and country dancing.

At Easter 1930 Winmill began renting a furnished labourer's cottage, dating back to the 1730s, at Church End, Henham, Essex, his mother's home village. Soon afterwards he bought the cottage and the one next door for holiday use, making visits there at Easter, Whitsun, summer and autumn for the next 10 years, before eventually living there permanently from 1942 onwards. In the autumn of 1930 he left Blackheath, and moved to Rochester, Kent, to a small Queen Anne house, at 1 Minor Canon Row, in the cathedral precinct (the link with Rochester came through his SPAB work). His life in Rochester was peaceful, giving him time for gardening and meeting old friends, for example at the Art Workers' Guild in London. He organised meetings and trips for the Guild, including a visit to his own house in Rochester, in June 1939, focusing on the furniture and other craftwork.

With the advent of the Second World War, things inevitably began to change. In anticipation of aerial bombing, ARP preparations were already being made in 1938. During the early stages of the war, Winmill alternated between Rochester and Henham, but it became necessary to leave Rochester completely in September 1942, a sad time for him, as he loved the house there, and he went to live permanently at Henham.

Winmill lost both of his brothers at an early age: William, an accountant, died in August 1921, and Hallett, a mining engineer, died on 11 December 1938. Winmill felt isolated at Henham in his last years, made worse by wartime conditions, and he complained of having 'no work to do', with a lot of his personal things, including books, held in storage. He kept himself occupied with gardening (vegetables and apple trees) and carpentry, went for bicycle rides along the country lanes, and kept up correspondence with friends. He made a few visits to the City of London, once in the spring of 1941 and about three times in 1942. He was saddened to see all the wartime bomb damage in the area around St Paul's Cathedral, Cheapside and Liverpool Street. He felt overawed by the sight of the Cathedral from Newgate Street. In April 1942 he was writing about what he had seen in letters to friends, saying that he would wish to rebuild London according to the ideas in William Morris's book, News from Nowhere, with more open space around St Paul's, rather than having all the damaged City churches rebuilt. In his own village of Henham, he was disturbed by the noise of bombers overhead at night, in March 1944 bombs narrowly missed Henham, and later that year he was upset to see extensive damage to the village caused by a flying bomb. Further sadness came when he heard of the death of the artist Sir George Clausen in November 1944, remembering how much he had learned from him in his early days about painting and pictures.

After a short illness and an operation, Winmill died in hospital on 11 January 1945. He was buried on 15 January at the church of St Mary the Virgin, Henham; the funeral address was given by Walter Browne (1885-1959), Archdeacon of Rochester, who referred to Winmill's art and craftsmanship, the influence of John Ruskin and William Morris, his preference for simplicity of style, the high standards he set in his work, his perfectionism, reverence, and love of beauty.

According to the Chelmsford Chronicle of 4 May 1945, Winmill left £14,171 in his will. His wife Anne lived on for another 11 years, dying on 15 September 1956. His daughter Joyce wrote a biography of her father which was published in the year after his death; she continued living in the family cottage in Church End, Henham, and became a local historian and speaker on a range of subjects. Joyce Winmill describes her father as a religious man, good with children, kind, gentle, but also quick tempered, followed by penitence and apology. He loved beautiful things, always wore Liberty silk ties, and enjoyed reading the poetry of William Morris and Christina Rossetti. He was a man of habit and routine who went to the same tailor in the City of London for over 50 years, he was a tidy person, a keeper of detailed accounts, and he lived by the motto of 'no short cuts'.

== Publications ==
=== Sole author ===
- Chingford Old Church, Reprinted from Transactions of the Essex Archaeological Society, Vol. XXI, Part 2, Colchester[?], 1937[?].

=== Contributing author ===
- Thackeray Turner, W R Lethaby, Philip Webb, C C Winmill, C R Ashbee, Report on the restoration of Saint Mary Stratford Bow, London: E Arnold, 1900.
- A H Powell, F W Troup, C C Winmill, The Society for the Protection of Ancient Buildings: report on the treatment of old cottages, London: A R Powys, 1919.

=== Letters ===
- Letters from Winmill to his friend and colleague Owen Fleming, with whom he worked for many years in the LCC Architect's Department, dated 1901-1944, held in the RIBA Library Archive. These are mainly personal letters which sometimes mention Winmill's architectural work, as well as his activities for the Society for the Protection of Ancient Buildings (SPAB) and Art Workers' Guild.
- Miscellaneous correspondence, 1839-1912, including 13 letters between Philip Webb and Charles Canning Winmill, held in the National Art Library, Victoria and Albert Museum.
- William Morris papers, 1839-1999, including archival material relating to Winmill, held in the Huntington Library, San Marino, California, USA.
