= List of public art in St James's =

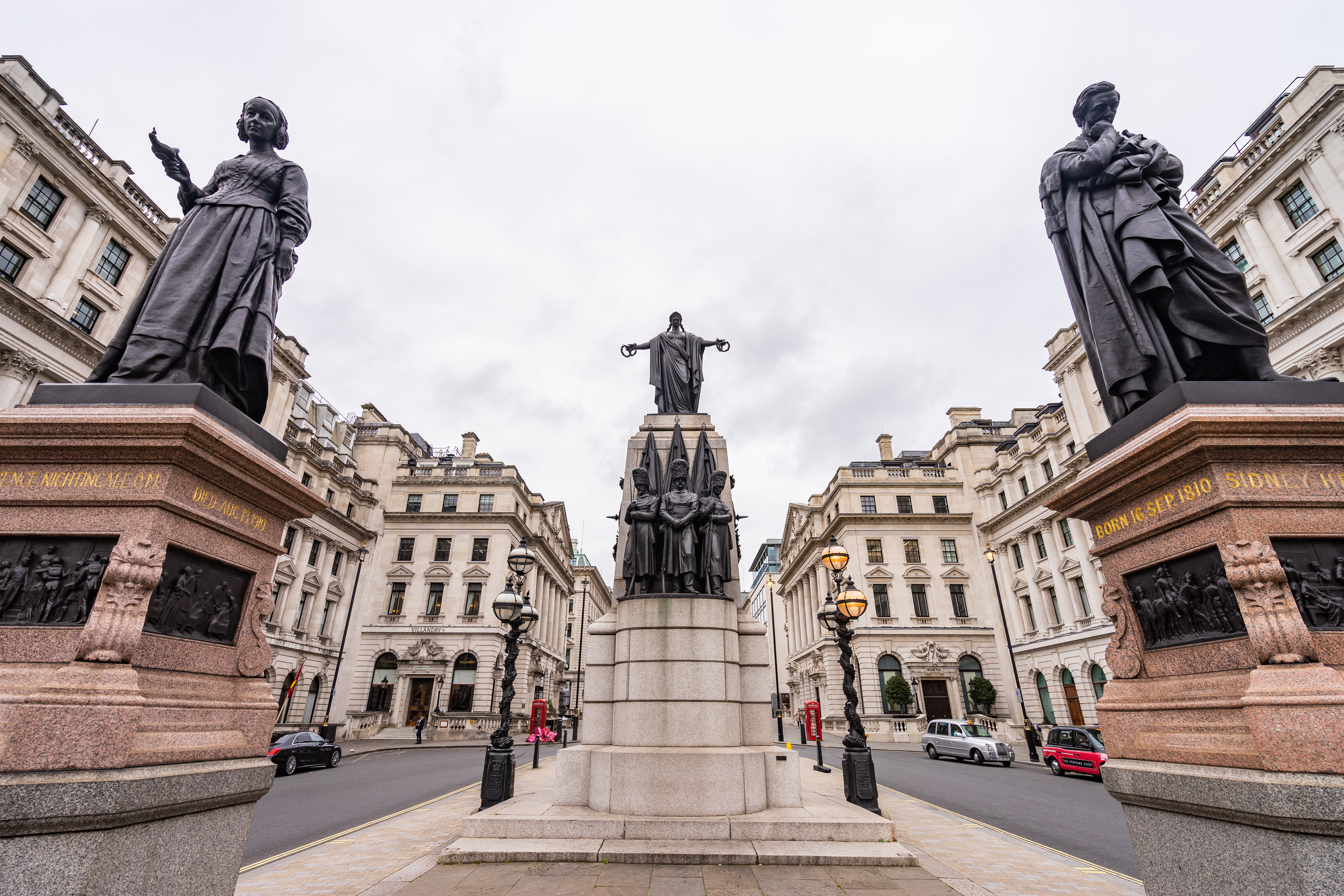
The statue of Florence Nightingale, the Crimean War Memorial and the statue of Sidney Herbert, Waterloo Place

This is a list of public art in St James's, a district in the City of Westminster, London.

St James's lies to the north of St James's Park, a former hunting ground attached to St James's Palace. The Mall, marking the northern boundary of the park, was transformed into a major thoroughfare in the 1900s by Aston Webb as part of the national memorial to Queen Victoria. Its focal point looking west is the Victoria Memorial designed by Thomas Brock, one of several memorials set along its axis from the early 20th century onwards.

To the east The Mall joins John Nash's processional route (which originally connected Carlton House to Regent's Park) at Carlton House Terrace. The part of this route within St James's includes Waterloo Place, described as "one of the more dramatic pieces of town planning in London" and lined with statues and memorials mainly of a military character.

Elsewhere in the district, the Economist Plaza hosted changing displays of contemporary sculpture in the early 21st century; this programme came to an end in 2010 after running for over ten years.

Image	Title / subject	Location and coordinates	Date	Artist / designer	Architect / other	Type	Designation	Notes
More images	Statue of William III	St James's Square 51°30′26″N 0°08′07″W	1807	John Bacon (Jr)	—N/a	Equestrian statue	Grade I	Very likely to a design of the sculptor's father John Bacon (Sr), dating to 1794. The design is probably inspired by John Michael Rysbrack's equestrian statue of William III in Queen Square, Bristol.
More images	Pallas Athene	Athenaeum Club, Waterloo Place	1829	Edward Hodges Baily	Decimus Burton	Statue	Grade I	A gilt copy of the Athena of Velletri. The spear is a later addition.
More images	Frieze	Athenaeum Club, Waterloo Place	1829	John Henning (Sr) and John Henning (Jr)	Decimus Burton	Frieze	Grade I	A copy of the Parthenon Frieze. The background was painted blue, "Wedgwood-fashion", in 1856.
More images	Duke of York Column Prince Frederick, Duke of York and Albany	Waterloo Place 51°30′23″N 0°07′54″W	1829–1834	Richard Westmacott	Benjamin Dean Wyatt	Statue on column	Grade I	The Duke, in his Garter robes, stands atop an unfluted Doric column. Westmacott intended for the statue to face north towards Regent Street, but William IV, on the Duke of Wellington's advice, requested that it face the Horse Guards to the south. The column was completed in 1832 and the statue raised on 3 April 1834.
More images	Statue of George III	Cockspur Street, facing down Pall Mall 51°30′28″N 0°07′50″W	c. 1836	Matthew Cotes Wyatt	—N/a	Equestrian statue	Grade II	Unveiled 3 August 1836 by the Duke of Cumberland. After the King's death in 1820 Wyatt designed an ambitious multi-figure monument, but there were too few subscriptions for the project to go ahead. Fund-raising recommenced in 1831. The statue came to be nicknamed "the Pigtail and Pump-head".
More images	Buckingham Palace Gates	Forecourt of Buckingham Palace 51°30′05″N 0°08′29″W	1850–1851 (north); 1904–1908 (south); 1911 (centre)	John Thomas, W. S. Frith, Walter Gilbert and Louis Weingartner	Decimus Burton and Aston Webb	Gates and piers with sculptural decoration	Grade I	Burton's gates were installed after the removal of Marble Arch, formerly the ceremonial entrance to the palace. Webb commissioned the Bromsgrove Guild to produce replicas with minor variations, which were erected on the southern side. The central gates were added at the request of George V.
More images	The Guards Crimean War Memorial	Waterloo Place 51°30′27″N 0°07′58″W	1858–1862	John Bell	—N/a	Memorial with sculpture	Grade II	The figures at the base of the plinth are of a Grenadier, a Fusilier and a Coldstream Guard; the crowning figure represents Honour. They are cast in bronze from cannon captured at the Siege of Sevastopol.
More images	The Boy	St James's Park 51°30′04″N 0°08′03″W	1863	Charles Henry Mabey for Robert Jackson & Son	—N/a	Drinking fountain with sculpture	Grade II	A marble figure of a boy naked to the waist, set on a granite plinth with marble panels. The badly worn and much vandalised sculpture was repaired in 1993 and unveiled by Douglas Hurd.
More images	Statue of John Franklin	Waterloo Place 51°30′23″N 0°07′56″W	1866	Matthew Noble	—N/a	Statue	Grade II	Unveiled 15 November 1866. Franklin is depicted in the act of announcing the discovery of the Northwest Passage to his officers and crew. At the back of the pedestal is a map of the Arctic, showing the positions of the boats and crews at the moment of Franklin's burial.
More images	Statue of Sidney Herbert, 1st Baron Herbert of Lea	Waterloo Place 51°30′26″N 0°07′58″W	1867	John Henry Foley	Thomas Henry Wyatt	Statue	Grade II	Unveiled 1 June 1867 in Pall Mall. Moved to the courtyard of the War Office, Whitehall, in 1906. In 1915 it was moved to Waterloo Place where it acts as a pendant to Florence Nightingale's statue; the latter was given a matching plinth.
More images	Statue of Colin Campbell, 1st Baron Clyde	Waterloo Place 51°30′24″N 0°07′54″W	1867	Carlo Marochetti	—N/a	Statue and other sculpture	Grade II	The statue stands on a cylindrical granite pedestal; on a lower base projecting from this is a group of Victory seated on a lion. Originally intended for Horse Guards Parade, but when the pedestal was installed there the Admiralty complained that it was blocking their entrance, and the site was changed.
More images	Statue of John Fox Burgoyne	Waterloo Place 51°30′23″N 0°07′56″W	1877	Joseph Edgar Boehm	—N/a	Statue	Grade II	Originally intended to stand outside the War Office in Whitehall. Boehm incorporated a tiny group of Saint George and the Dragon by his pupil Alfred Gilbert at the end of Burgoyne's baton.
More images	Statue of John Lawrence, 1st Baron Lawrence	Waterloo Place 51°30′24″N 0°07′54″W	1885	Joseph Edgar Boehm	—N/a	Statue	Grade II	A replacement for Boehm's statue of 1882, which was heavily criticised for its realism. This was presented to Lahore, where it proved equally controversial; in 1962 it was brought to Derry and erected in front of Foyle College, Lawrence's old school.
	Laura Lyttelton Memorial Drinking Fountain	Piccadilly, against churchyard wall of St James's Church	after 1886	?	?	Drinking fountain		Inscribed IN MEMORIAM/ LAURA LYTTELTON/ DIED/ EASTER DAY 1886
	Rosetta Sotheran Memorial Drinking Fountain	Piccadilly, against churchyard wall of St James's Church	after 1892	?	?	Drinking fountain		Inscribed IN MEMORIAM/ ROSETTA SOTHERAN/ DIED/ JULY 5^{TH} 1892
	Putti	NatWest bank, 207–209 Piccadilly	c. 1892–1894	F. W. Pomeroy	Alfred Waterhouse	Relief	Grade II	
More images	Statue of Queen Victoria	Forecourt of 16 Carlton House Terrace 51°30′24″N 0°07′50″W	c. 1898–1902	Thomas Brock	—N/a	Statue	—N/a	Unveiled 5 February 1902 by Lord Salisbury in the Junior Constitutional Club, Piccadilly; sold in 1940. Moved to the present site in 1971, when this building was being used as an annexe of the National Portrait Gallery.
More images	Victoria Memorial Queen Victoria	Queen Victoria Memorial Gardens, The Mall 51°30′07″N 0°08′26″W	1901–1924	Thomas Brock	—N/a	Memorial with sculpture	Grade I	Unveiled 16 May 1911 by George V. Brock was adamant that he, and not Aston Webb, was responsible for the architectural design of the memorial. Despite never having travelled to France, he produced a work that was convincingly abreast with belle époque fashion.
More images	Royal Marines Memorial	The Mall 51°30′24″N 0°07′46″W	1903	Adrian Jones	Thomas Graham Jackson	Memorial with sculpture	Grade II	Unveiled 25 April 1903 by the Prince of Wales (the future George V), on a site now occupied by the Admiralty Citadel. Removed in 1940 and reinstalled on the Mall in 1948.
More images	Australia Gate	Queen Victoria Memorial Gardens 51°30′04″N 0°08′24″W	1905–1908	Francis Derwent Wood	Aston Webb	Piers with sculptural decoration	Grade I	The nude boys on the two piers hold the 1908 coat of arms of Australia; the western boy is accompanied by a kangaroo and the eastern by a Merino ram.
More images	Canada Gate	Queen Victoria Memorial Gardens 51°30′09″N 0°08′29″W	1905–1908	Henry Alfred Pegram	Aston Webb	Gates and piers with sculptural decoration	Grade I	The nude boys on the outermost piers hold the 1868 arms of Canada and have attributes referring to fishing and agriculture. The gates were produced by the Bromsgrove Guild.
	South Africa Gate	Queen Victoria Memorial Gardens 51°30′08″N 0°08′22″W	1905–1908	Alfred Drury	Aston Webb	Piers with sculptural decoration	Grade I	The nude boy on the northern pier, representing South Africa, holds a shield with the arms of the Cape Colony; that on the southern, representing West Africa, holds a blank shield.
	Entrance sculpture	161 Piccadilly	c. 1906–1908	Alfred Drury	Belcher & Joass	Architectural sculpture	Grade II*	
	Putti	161 Piccadilly	c. 1906–1908	Bertram Mackennal	Belcher & Joass	Architectural sculpture	Grade II*	The figures are made to appear as though "they have clambered up from the niches below to hold up the cornice".
	Justice	162–165 Piccadilly	1907–1909	Hibbert Charles Binney	Runtz & Ford	Architectural sculpture	Grade II	The flanking figures may symbolise Foresight and Prudence.
More images	Royal Artillery Boer War Memorial	The Mall 51°30′19″N 0°07′52″W	1910	William Robert Colton	Aston Webb	Memorial with sculpture	Grade II	Unveiled 20 July 1910 by the Duke of Connaught. Colton was given the commission after Thomas Brock turned it down due to the pressure of other commitments. Few were pleased with the resulting memorial.
	Justice, Progress and Industry and the arms of British Columbia	11 Charles II Street (formerly British Columbia House), Regent Street St James's façade	c. 1914	F. W. Pomeroy	Alfred Burr	Architectural sculpture	Grade II	
More images	Statue of James Cook	The Mall 51°30′23″N 0°07′45″W	1914	Thomas Brock	probably Aston Webb	Statue	Grade II	Unveiled 7 July 1914 by the Duke of Connaught. The idea for the memorial was first proposed by the former Prime Minister of New South Wales, who wrote to The Times complaining of the lack of a statue to Captain Cook in London.
More images	Statue of Florence Nightingale	Waterloo Place 51°30′26″N 0°07′57″W	1915	Arthur George Walker	Thomas Henry Wyatt	Statue	Grade II	Unveiled 24 February 1915. The last of a group of three memorials with a Crimean theme on Waterloo Place. The plinth is a copy of that of the statue of Lord Herbert, and is decorated with bronze reliefs of scenes from Nightingale's life.
More images	Statue of Robert Falcon Scott	Waterloo Place 51°30′25″N 0°07′55″W	1915	Kathleen Scott	—N/a	Statue	Grade II	Unveiled 5 November 1915 by Arthur Balfour. The sculptor was Captain Scott's widow; she produced a marble replica for Christchurch, New Zealand.
More images	Statue of Edward VII	Waterloo Place 51°30′24″N 0°07′56″W	1921	Bertram Mackennal	Edwin Lutyens	Equestrian statue	Grade II	Unveiled 20 July 1921 by George V. Edward VII is depicted in Field Marshal's uniform. Stands on the site previously occupied by the equestrian statue of Lord Napier now at Queen's Gate, Kensington.
More images	Army and Navy Club War Memorial	Outside the Army and Navy Club, Pall Mall 51°30′22″N 0°08′08″W	1923–1926	Basil Gotto	—N/a	Statue	—N/a	Originally stood in the Victorian clubhouse, which was demolished around 1962. The memorial went into storage at the Ministry of Defence. In 2001 it was returned to the club and displayed in a glass case outside its 1960s building.
	Mary of Nazareth	Churchyard of St James's, Piccadilly 51°30′31″N 0°08′13″W	c. 1925	Charles Wheeler	—N/a	Statue	—N/a	The sculpture, exhibited at the Royal Academy in 1925, was offered to St James's Church by Wheeler's family after his death. It was erected on this site in 1975.
More images	Peace	Churchyard of St James's, Piccadilly 51°30′30″N 0°08′14″W	c. 1926	Alfred Frank Hardiman	—N/a	Statue	—N/a	As Hardiman died in 1949 leaving his Southwood Memorial for the churchyard unfinished, the sculptor's widow gave this earlier work to St James's as a substitute and as a memorial to her husband.
More images	Queen Alexandra Memorial Alexandra of Denmark	Marlborough Road 51°30′17″N 0°08′12″W	1926–1932	Alfred Gilbert	—N/a	Memorial with sculpture	Grade I	Unveiled 8 June 1932 by George V. Despite Gilbert's earlier disgrace with the royal family after failing to complete the Duke of Clarence's tomb, the Queen was said to have expressed a wish that he sculpt her memorial should he outlive her. Gilbert, aged 78, was knighted the day after its unveiling.
More images	Statue of George Curzon, 1st Marquess Curzon of Kedleston	Carlton House Terrace 51°30′22″N 0°08′00″W	1930	Bertram Mackennal	—N/a	Statue	Grade II	Unveiled 20 March 1931 by Stanley Baldwin. The statue stands opposite the viceroy's former house. Mackennal had previously sculpted Curzon's tomb effigy in All Saints Church, Kedleston.
More images	Cries of London	Buchanan House, 3 St James's Square	c. 1933–1934	Newbury Abbot Trent	Alfred and David Ospalak	Reliefs	—N/a	
	Gates	St James's, Piccadilly	1937	William Bainbridge Reynolds	Reginald Blomfield (destroyed surround)	Gates		Originally with an architectural setting by Blomfield, these gates were installed to mark the coronation of George VI. They replaced the old entrance archway to St James's churchyard. Blomfield's work was destroyed in 1940 and the gates are now set into post-war railings.
More images	Memorial to Julius Salter Elias, 1st Viscount Southwood	Churchyard of St James's, Piccadilly 51°30′31″N 0°08′14″W	1948	Alfred Frank Hardiman	Albert Richardson	Memorial with sculpture	Grade II	At the entrance to the Garden of Remembrance financed by Southwood, a newspaper magnate. Putti on dolphins and playing musical instruments refer to his charitable work for the children's hospital at Great Ormond Street.
	Sundial	Pickering Place	before 1953	?	—N/a	Armillary sphere	—N/a	
More images	Statue of George VI	King George VI and Queen Elizabeth Memorial, Carlton House Terrace 51°30′19″N 0°08′02″W	1955	William McMillan	Louis de Soissons (1955) Donald Insall (2008)	Statue	Grade II	Unveiled 21 October 1955 by Elizabeth II. The statue was moved forward from its original setting in 2008 to form part of a joint memorial with the King's wife, Queen Elizabeth (the Queen Mother).
More images	Clock	Fortnum & Mason, Piccadilly	1964	Eric Aumonier	Wimperis, Simpson & Guthrie (1926–1929)	Automated clock		
	Mural	The Cavendish Hotel, Duke Street	1966	William Mitchell	Maurice Hanna	Mural	—N/a	
More images	Queen Mary Memorial Mary of Teck	Junction of The Mall and Marlborough Road 51°30′17″N 0°08′08″W	1967	William Reid Dick	Alan Reynolds Stone (lettering)	Plaque with relief sculpture	—N/a	Unveiled 7 June 1967. The profile portrait is a bronze replica of the memorial to Queen Mary at St Mary Magdalene's Church, Sandringham, Norfolk.
More images	Memorial to Yvonne Fletcher	St James's Square 51°30′28″N 0°08′06″W	1985	George Cook and Rosemary Slinn	—N/a	Stele	—N/a	Unveiled 1 February 1985 by Margaret Thatcher. The first memorial to be erected by the Police Memorial Trust, founded in response to Fletcher's shooting during a siege of the Libyan embassy on the Square.
	Moonlight Ramble	Haymarket House, 27 Haymarket	1992	Jane Ackroyd	Stone, Toms & Partners (1939–1955)	Architectural sculpture	—N/a	A design suggestive of an abstracted mask, inspired by 18th-century masked balls. The first such ball in England was held at the Haymarket Opera House.
More images	Statue of Charles de Gaulle	Carlton Gardens 51°30′20″N 0°08′03″W	1993	Angela Conner	Bernard Wiehahn	Statue	—N/a	Unveiled 23 June 1993 by the Queen Mother. De Gaulle (who requested that no statues be raised to him) gestures with his left hand towards 4 Carlton Gardens, the headquarters of the Free French from 1940.
	Eclipse Charles Moore, 11th Earl of Drogheda	Economist Plaza 51°30′25″N 0°08′21″W	1996	Angela Conner	—N/a	Fountain with sculpture	—N/a	The memorial fountain consists of two moving discs mounted on a wall, which slowly fill up with water. In 2008 Conner voiced her displeasure with the Economist's neglect of the work's upkeep.
	Two Wave Form	Outside Anglo American Head Office, 20 Carlton House Terrace 51°30′25″N 0°07′49″W	1999	John Sydney Carter	—N/a	Sculpture	—N/a	Commissioned by Westminster City Council.
	States of Mind	Carlton House Terrace	1999	David John Kent		Relief		
	Stag	St James's Square 51°30′24″N 0°08′08″W	2001	Marcus Cornish	—N/a	Statue	—N/a	Commissioned by the developer Patrick Despard for Cleveland House, St James's Square. As the sculpture did not find favour with the building's occupants, it was presented to the trustees of the square.
More images	Statue of Beau Brummell	Jermyn Street 51°30′28″N 0°08′20″W	2002	Irena Sedlecká	—N/a	Statue	—N/a	Unveiled 5 November 2002 by Princess Michael of Kent. Sedlecká originally conceived the sculpture for the New Bond Street site now occupied by Lawrence Holofcener's Allies.
More images	National Police Memorial	The Mall, in front of the Admiralty Citadel 51°30′21″N 0°07′48″W	2005	Per Arnoldi	Foster and Partners	Memorial with stele	—N/a	Unveiled 26 April 2005 by Elizabeth II. The memorial incorporates a ventilation shaft for the London Underground, faced with black granite and containing a Roll of Honour.
More images	Statue of Queen Elizabeth The Queen Mother	King George VI and Queen Elizabeth Memorial, The Mall 51°30′18″N 0°08′01″W	2009	Philip Jackson (statue); Paul Day (reliefs)	Donald Buttress, Donald Insall	Memorial with statue and relief sculpture	—N/a	Unveiled 24 February 2009 by Elizabeth II. Part of a joint memorial to the Queen Mother and her husband George VI, which incorporates William McMillan's 1955 statue of the latter. A second cast of Jackson's statue was erected in Poundbury, Dorset, in 2016.
More images	Statue of Keith Park	Waterloo Place 51°30′24″N 0°07′57″W	2010	Les Johnson	—N/a	Statue	—N/a	Unveiled 15 September 2010, on the 70th anniversary of the Battle of Britain. Previously a larger, fibreglass version of the statue was displayed on the Fourth Plinth at Trafalgar Square for six months. It is now at the Royal Air Force Museum in Hendon.
	Cornice	One Eagle Place (Piccadilly)	2013	Richard Deacon	Eric Parry Architects	Architectural sculpture	—N/a	Unveiled 6 March 2013.
	Bust of Simon Milton	One Eagle Place (Corner of Piccadilly and Eagle Place)	2013	Alan Micklethwaite		Architectural sculpture		Unveiled by Boris Johnson, Mayor of London; Milton was a Deputy Mayor before his death in 2011 aged 49.
	Architectural sculpture	One Eagle Place (Corner of Eagle Place and Jermyn Street)	2013	Stephen Cox	Eric Parry Architects	Architectural sculpture	—N/a	Unveiled 13 June 2013.
	Relief: Figure Emerging and Inscribed Rail to E.L. Edwin Lutyens	Apple Tree Yard (rear of 8 St James's Square)	2014–15	Stephen Cox	Eric Parry	Relief and inscription	—N/a	
	Shirt, Tie, Pipe and Shoe	St James's Market	2016	Studio Swine		Sculptural benches	—N/a	
	The Safe Deposite	St James's Market	2016	Studio Weave		Pavilion	—N/a	
	Encaustic tile panels	St James's Market	2016	David Thorpe		Encaustic tile panels	—N/a	
	Mother and Child Victims of sexual violence	St James's Square	2019	Rebecca Hawkins	—N/a	Statue	—N/a	Unveiled 11 June 2019 at Church House, Westminster.
More images	Banksy statue	Waterloo Place	2026	Banksy	—N/a	Statue	—N/a	The statue shows a man in a suit blindly walking off a plinth while holding a flag.
	Relief of John Nash	Nash Summer House, St James's Square	?	After Joseph Anton Couriguer	John Nash	Relief	Grade II	
	Relief of Henry John Temple, 3rd Viscount Palmerston	Pickering Place	?	?	—N/a	Relief	—N/a	

== Royal Institute of Painters in Water Colours ==
Image	Title / subject	Location and coordinates	Date	Artist / designer	Architect / other	Type	Designation	Notes
	Peter De Wint	Royal Institute of Painters in Water Colours, Piccadilly		Edward Onslow Ford	Edward Robert Robson	Bust	Grade II	
	John Robert Cozens	Royal Institute of Painters in Water Colours, Piccadilly		Edward Onslow Ford	Edward Robert Robson	Bust	Grade II	
	David Cox	Royal Institute of Painters in Water Colours, Piccadilly		Edward Onslow Ford	Edward Robert Robson	Bust	Grade II	
	Paul Sandby	Royal Institute of Painters in Water Colours, Piccadilly		Edward Onslow Ford	Edward Robert Robson	Bust	Grade II	
	George Barret, Jr.	Royal Institute of Painters in Water Colours, Piccadilly		Edward Onslow Ford	Edward Robert Robson	Bust	Grade II	
	Thomas Girtin	Royal Institute of Painters in Water Colours, Piccadilly		Edward Onslow Ford	Edward Robert Robson	Bust	Grade II	
	J. M. W. Turner	Royal Institute of Painters in Water Colours, Piccadilly		Edward Onslow Ford	Edward Robert Robson	Bust	Grade II	
	William Henry Hunt	Royal Institute of Painters in Water Colours, Piccadilly		Edward Onslow Ford	Edward Robert Robson	Bust	Grade II	
	Allegorical figures	Royal Institute of Painters in Water Colours, Piccadilly		Francis Verheyden	Edward Robert Robson		Grade II	

== See also ==
- Memorial to Elizabeth II, London, a memorial in St James's Park forthcoming as of 2026

== Bibliography ==
- Blackwood, John (1989). London's Immortals: The Complete Outdoor Commemorative Statues. London and Oxford: Savoy Press. ISBN 978-0951429600.
- Bradley, Simon; Pevsner, Nikolaus (2003). London 6: Westminster. The Buildings of England. London and New Haven: Yale University Press. ISBN 978-0-300-09595-1.
- Karlin, Daniel (2019). Street Songs: Writers and Urban Songs and Cries, 1800–1925. Clarendon Lectures in English. Oxford: Oxford University Press. ISBN 978-0198792352.
- Ward-Jackson, Philip (2011). Public Sculpture of Historic Westminster: Volume 1. Public Sculpture of Britain. Vol. 14. Liverpool: Liverpool University Press. ISBN 978-1-84631-691-3.
