= Banksy statue =

2026 sculpture by Banksy

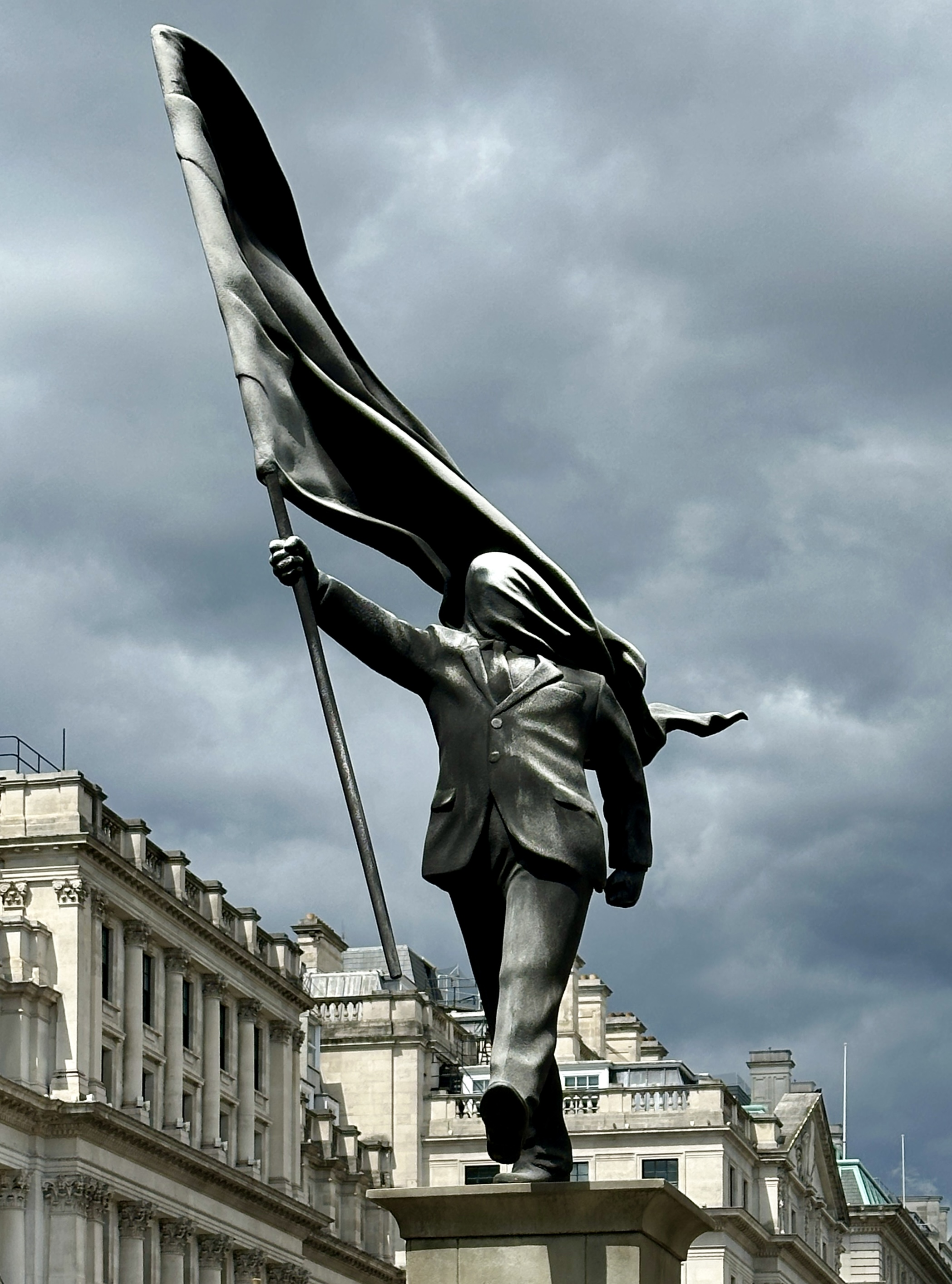
- Artist: Banksy
- Year: 2026
- Medium: Fibreglass or resin
- Location: Waterloo Place, London; 51.5070°N 0.1323°W

A statue by Banksy was installed at Waterloo Place in London, in 2026. It depicts a man in a suit holding a large flag in front of himself as it blows back in his face, obscuring his vision, as he steps off the plinth on which he is standing. Commentators have noted the placement of the work near statues and monuments commemorating British imperialism such as that of Edward VII and the Crimean War Memorial.

== Description ==
In the early hours of the morning on 29 April 2026, the statue was installed in Waterloo Place near St James's in London. Passersby noticed that the plinth of the statue had Banksy's signature inscribed on it. After the artist posted a video of the installation and the statue on 30 April, the BBC confirmed that the artist was responsible for the statue.

The statue shows a man wearing a suit holding a large flag in his right hand as he walks forward off the plinth on which he is standing. The flag is shown blowing back into his face, obscuring his vision.

== Response ==
Commentators noted the placement of the work close to monuments to British imperial and military history. Art dealer Philip Mould said "what's rather clever about it is he's got the proportions perfectly right for the space". Critic Alex Dale wrote that the sculpture has "the aesthetics of mass-produced garden-centre ornaments" and "the moral complexity of a Catchphrase clue".

A representative of Sadiq Khan, the mayor of London, said that Banksy's work "always draws great interest and debate, and the mayor is hopeful that his latest piece can be preserved for Londoners and visitors to enjoy". Representatives of Westminster City Council told the BBC that they found the work to be a "striking addition to the city's vibrant public art scene". Westminster City Council are responsible for the protection of the statue, and have installed fencing around it, saying that for the time being it would remain accessible to the public. By September they had spent over £60,000 on security and administration costs related to it, and issued a statement saying they had been "exploring all options" for the sculpture's future.

== See also ==
- 2026 in art
- List of public art in St James's
- List of works by Banksy
