= Statue of Captain James Cook, The Mall =

Statue by Thomas Brock in The Mall, London, England

Captain James Cook
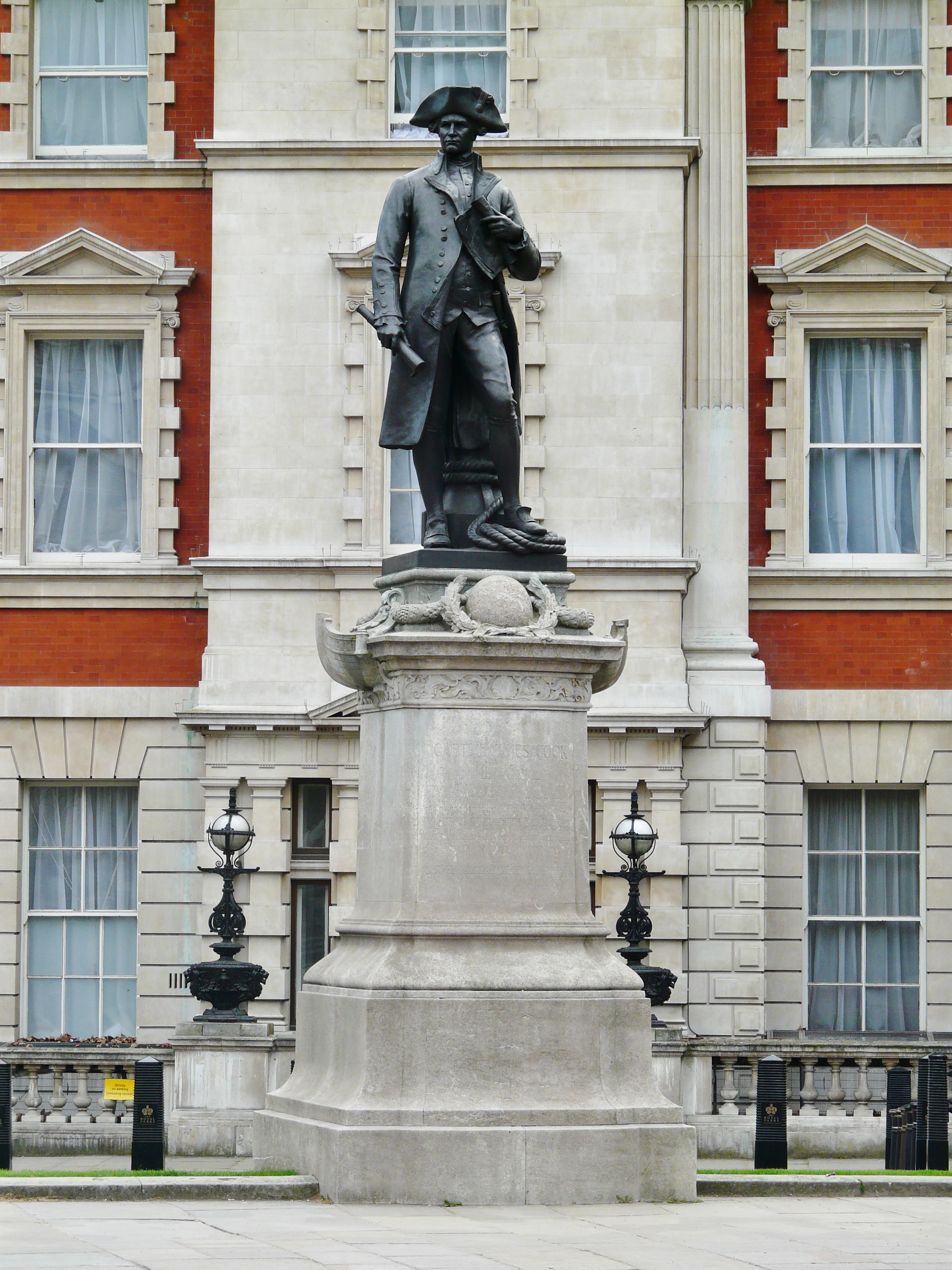
- The sculpture in 2014
- Artist: Thomas Brock
- Year: 1914; 112 years ago
- Type: Statue
- Medium: Bronze
- Subject: James Cook
- Location: London, WC2; 51°30′23″N 0°07′45″W

Listed Building – Grade II
- Official name: Statue of Captain Cook
- Designated: 5 February 1970
- Reference no.: 1239083

A bronze statue of Captain James Cook by Thomas Brock is located near Admiralty Arch on the south side of The Mall in London, United Kingdom. The statue was completed in 1914 and is maintained by The Royal Parks. It is mounted on a stone plinth.

The idea for the memorial was first proposed by Joseph Carruthers, the former premier of New South Wales, who had written to The Times complaining of the lack of a statue to Captain Cook in London. The completed work was unveiled on 7 July 1914 by Prince Arthur, Duke of Connaught and Strathearn.

== See also ==
- List of public art in St James's
