= Equestrian statue of George III, London =

Bronze statue in London

Coordinates: 51.5078°N 0.1305°W

Equestrian statue of George III
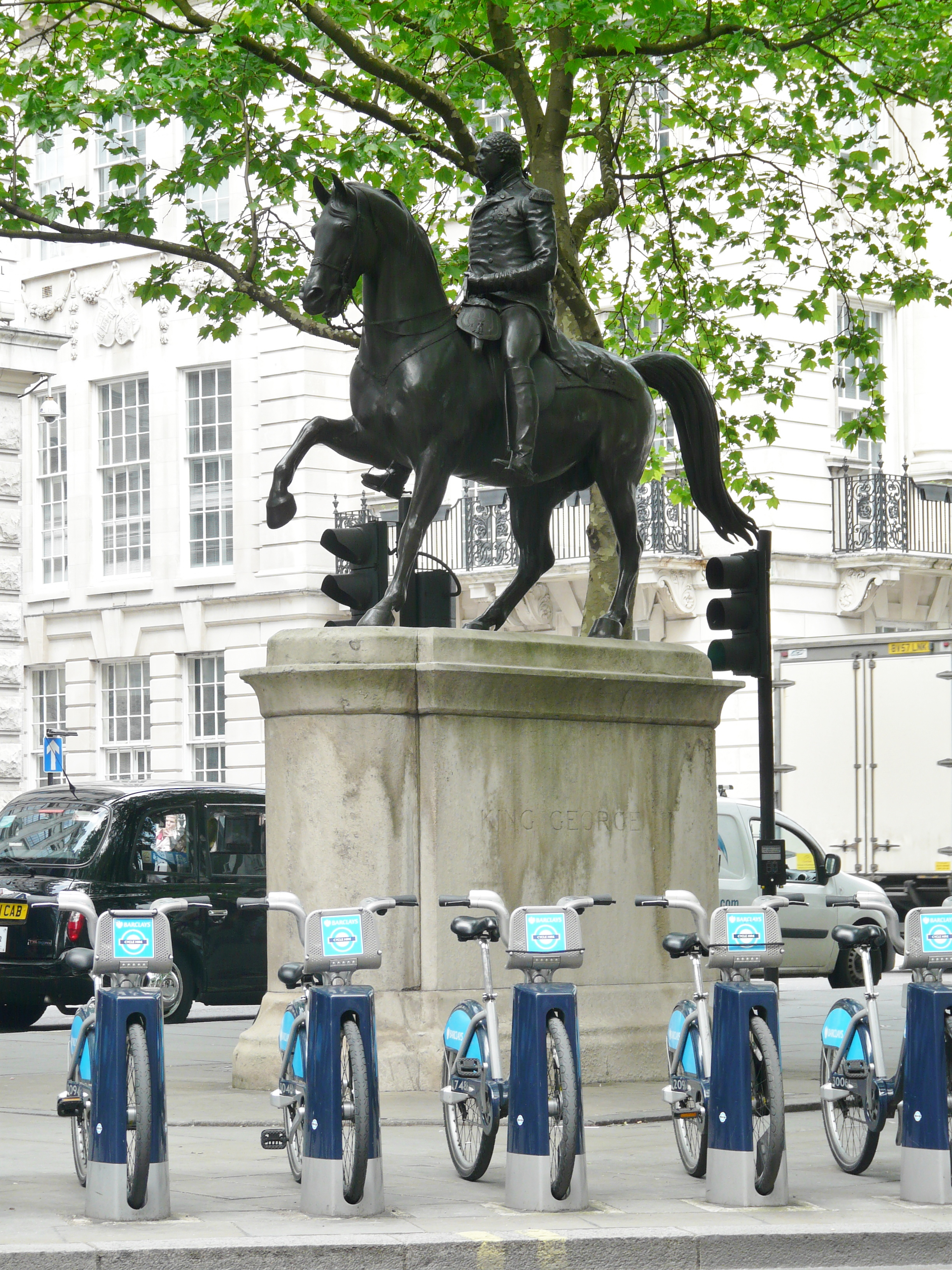
- The statue in 2014
- Artist: Matthew Cotes Wyatt
- Completion date: 1836
- Subject: George III
- Location: London

Listed Building – Grade II
- Official name: Statue of George III on Island at Junction With Pall Mall East
- Designated: 9 January 1970
- Reference no.: 1219890

The equestrian statue of George III is a Grade II listed statue that stands on the junction between Pall Mall and Cockspur Street in London.

The statue was commissioned in 1822 and was met with poor reception even before being put up. It was completed in 1836 by Matthew Cotes Wyatt, depicting George III, the first Hanoverian king to associate himself strongly with his British rather than German identity.

The statue depicts George III in bronze upon a Portland stone pedestal. He is in 'Windsor uniform' and riding on the back of Adonis, which served as the king's favourite horse for twenty years. The king's hair depicted in a pigtail led to Cockspur Street gaining the nickname "Pigtail Street".
