= British Columbia House =

Grade II listed house in Westminster, United Kingdom

Coordinates: 51°30′29.2″N 0°8′00.7″W

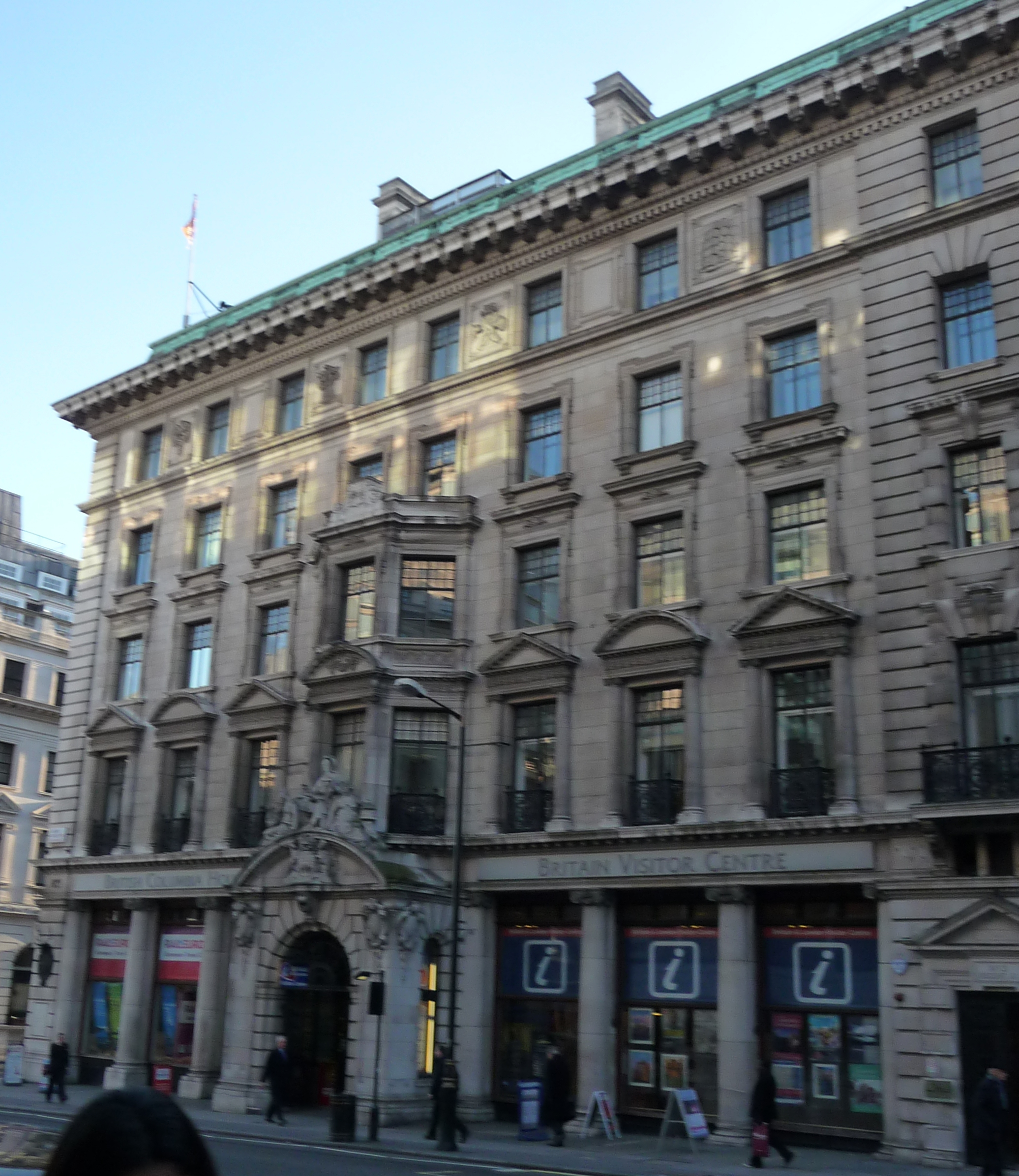
British Columbia House, Regent Street, Westminster, London.

British Columbia House is a Grade II listed building at 1 and 3, Regent Street, Westminster, London.

Designed by architect Alfred Burr, British Columbia House was constructed in 1914 as the premises of the Agent-General of the province of British Columbia, a position then held by John Herbert Turner. At the time of the building's official opening, in 1915, Turner had been replaced by Richard McBride, but McBride's death, in 1917, saw Turner return to the Agent-General's role.

The building is owned by the Crown Estate and is now a commercial building. It underwent a £8.5 million refurbishment in 2013.
