= Statue of Lord Lawrence =

Statue in London, England

Coordinates: 51.5066°N 0.1316°W

Lord Lawrence
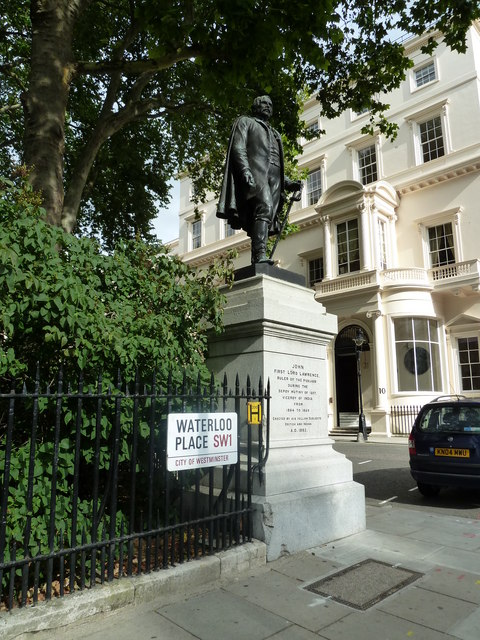
- Statue of Lord Lawrence in London
- Artist: Joseph Edgar Boehm
- Completion date: 1882
- Subject: John Lawrence, 1st Baron Lawrence
- Location: London

Listed Building – Grade II
- Official name: Statue of Lord Lawrence
- Designated: 5 February 1970
- Reference no.: 1066146

The Statue of Lord Lawrence is a Grade II listed statue on the southeastern corner of Waterloo Place and Carlton House Terrace. It was erected in 1882.

John Lawrence, 1st Baron Lawrence, spent much of his life working for the Indian Civil Service, entering it in 1829. He would go on to be Viceroy of India from 1864 to 1869 after playing a significant role in the suppression of the Indian Mutiny. Despite this Lawrence is known to have approached local issues diplomatically, with a paternalistic approach to administration.

The statue was designed by Joseph Edgar Boehm. Originally Lawrence was to hold a sword in one hand and pen in another, a reference to a story where Lawrence had given India a choice between the two in how it was to be governed. The design was deemed inappropriate and a new design was made, the original eventually ending up in the hands of Foyle and Londonderry College which Lawrence had attended.
