= Statue of Sir Colin Campbell, Lord Clyde =

Statue in London

Coordinates: 51.5067°N 0.1317°W

Sir Colin Campbell, Lord Clyde
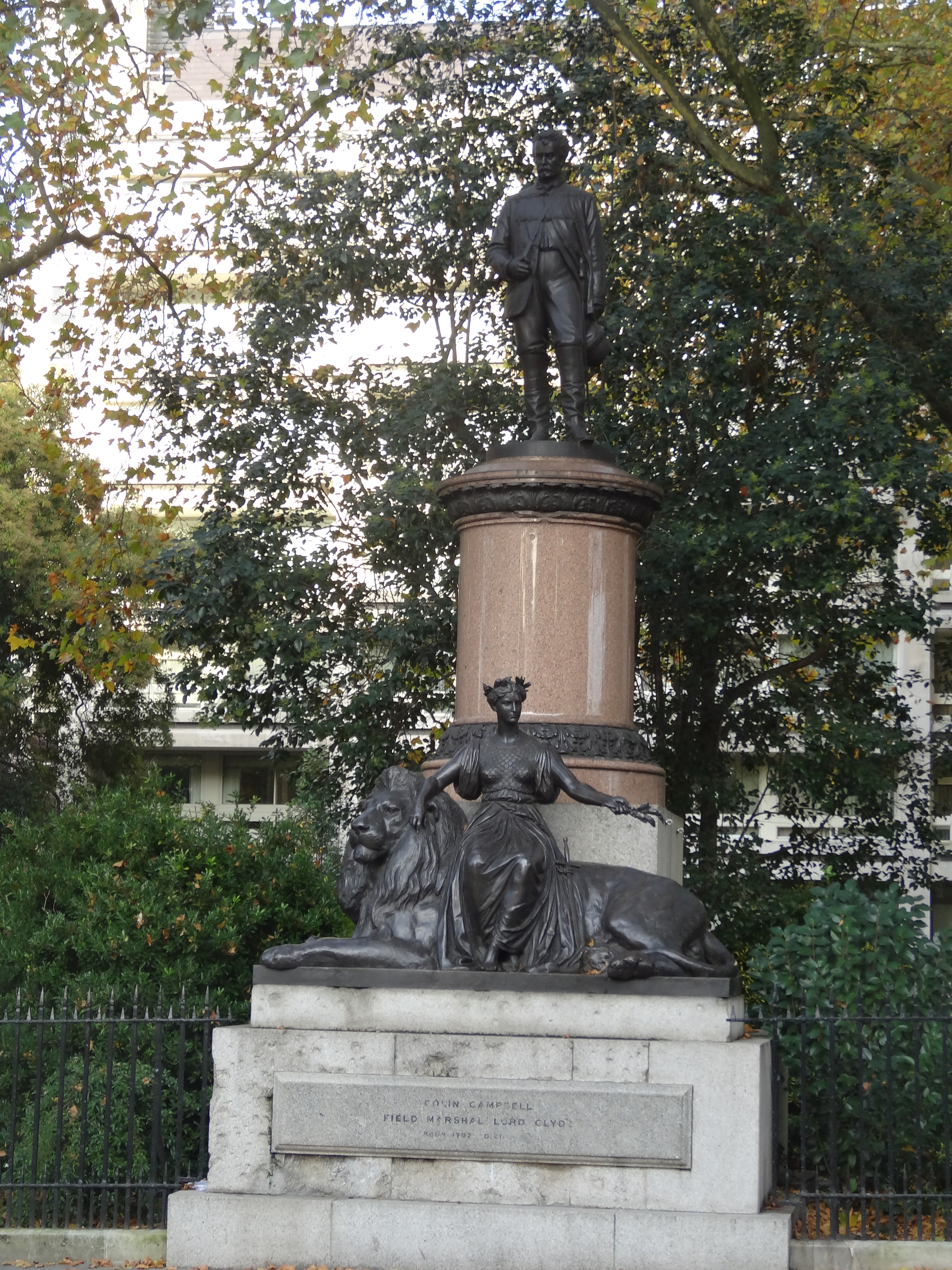
- Artist: Carlo Marochetti
- Completion date: 1867
- Subject: Colin Campbell, 1st Baron Clyde
- Location: London

Listed Building – Grade II
- Official name: Statue of Sir Colin Campbell, Lord Clyde
- Designated: 5 February 1970
- Reference no.: 1273744

The statue of Sir Colin Campbell, Lord Clyde is a Grade II listed statue on Waterloo Place in London. It was designed by Carlo Marochetti and erected in 1867.

Colin Campbell was a British Army officer who served during the Peninsular War, Crimean War and in India. His most significant act was lifting the Siege of Lucknow during the Indian Mutiny.

Campbell stands in bronze on a granite plinth, wearing the uniform he would have been during the mutiny. Below is a depiction of Britannia sitting upon a Lion holding an olive branch.

The original site of the statue was a different location on Horse Guards Parade but was moved following resistance, with the Duke of Wellington mediating the situation.
