= John Franklin =

British naval officer and explorer (1786–1847)

Rear-Admiral Sir John Franklin KCH FRS FLS FRGS
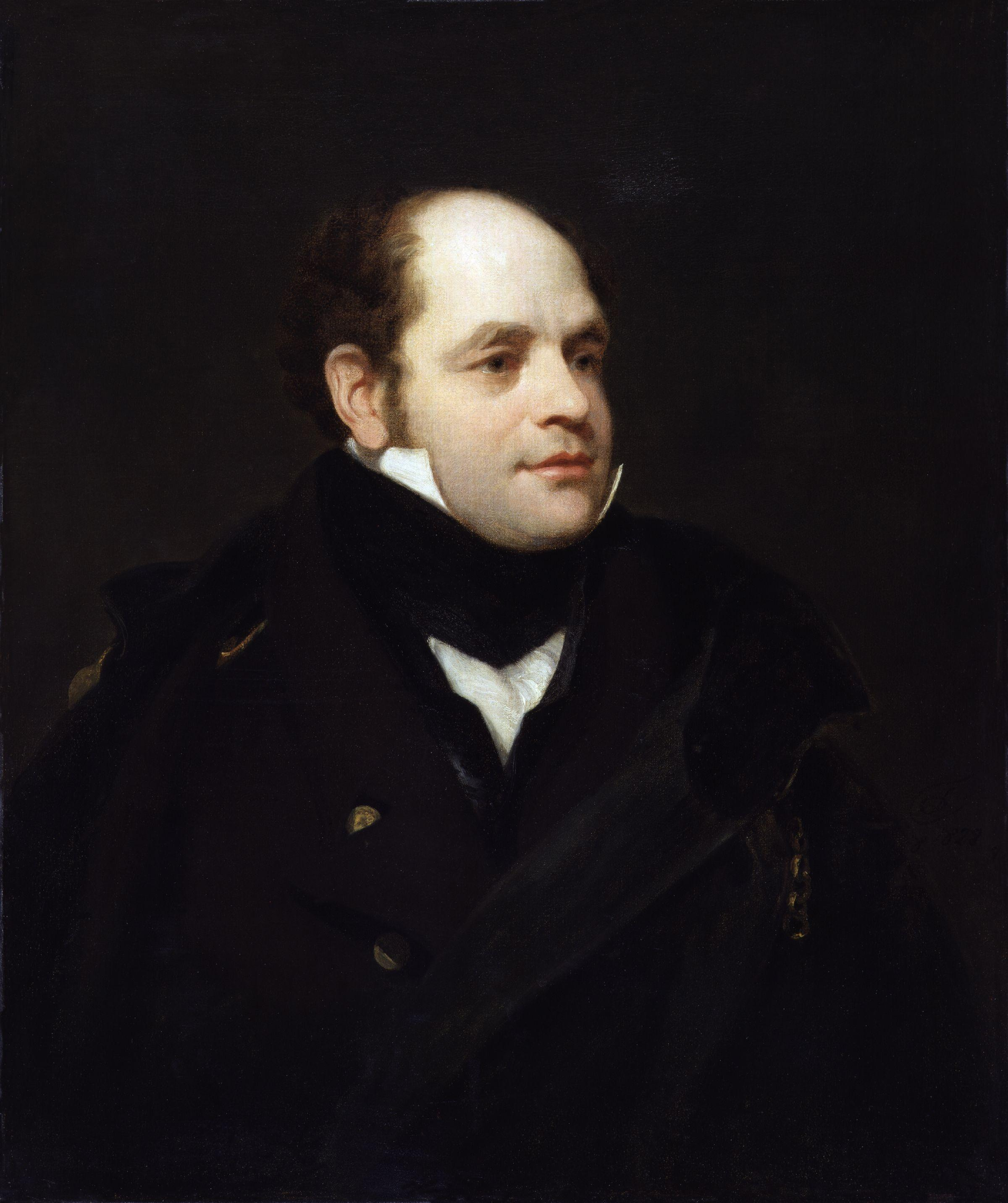
- Portrait of John Franklin by Thomas Phillips, 1828

Lieutenant-Governor of Van Diemen's Land
- In office 5 January 1837 – 21 August 1843
- Secretary: John Montagu
- Preceded by: Sir George Arthur
- Succeeded by: Sir John Eardley-Wilmot

Personal details
- Born: 16 April 1786 Spilsby, Lincolnshire, England
- Died: 11 June 1847 (aged 61) King William Island, North-Western Territory
- Spouses: Eleanor Anne Porden (m. 1823; died 1825) Jane Griffin (m. 1828)
- Children: Eleanor Isabella Franklin

Military service
- Branch: Royal Navy
- Service years: 1800–1847
- Rank: Rear-Admiral
- Wars: French Revolutionary Wars; Battle of Copenhagen; Napoleonic Wars; Battle of Pulo Aura; Battle of Trafalgar; War of 1812; Battle of Lake Borgne (WIA)
- Expeditions: Coppermine expedition; Mackenzie River expedition; Franklin's expedition

Rear-Admiral Sir John Franklin KCH FRS FLS FRGS (16 April 1786 – 11 June 1847) was a British Royal Navy officer, explorer and colonial administrator. After serving in the Napoleonic Wars and the War of 1812, he led two expeditions into the Canadian Arctic and through the islands of the Arctic Archipelago, during the Coppermine expedition of 1819 and the Mackenzie River expedition of 1825, and served as Lieutenant-Governor of Van Diemen's Land from 1837 to 1843. During his third and final expedition, an attempt to traverse the Northwest Passage in 1845, Franklin's ships became icebound off King William Island in what is now Nunavut, where he died in June 1847. The icebound ships were abandoned ten months later, and the entire crew died from starvation, hypothermia, and scurvy.

== Biography ==
=== Early life ===
Franklin was born in Spilsby, Lincolnshire, on 16 April 1786, the ninth of twelve children born to Willingham Franklin and Hannah née Weekes. His father was a merchant descended from a line of country gentlemen, while his mother was the daughter of a farmer. One of his brothers later entered the legal profession and eventually became a judge in Madras; another joined the East India Company; while a sister, Sarah, was the mother of Emily Tennyson, wife of Alfred, Lord Tennyson. John Franklin must have been affected by an obvious desire to better his social and economic position, given that his elder brothers struggled, sometimes successfully and sometimes not, to establish themselves in a wide variety of careers.

Educated at King Edward VI Grammar School in Louth, he soon became interested in a career at sea. His father, who intended for Franklin to enter the church or become a businessman, was initially opposed but was reluctantly convinced to allow him to go on a trial voyage on a merchant ship when he was aged 12. His experience of seafaring only confirmed his interest in a career at sea, so in March 1800, Franklin's father secured him a Royal Navy appointment on HMS Polyphemus.

Commanded by Captain Lawford, the Polyphemus carried 64 guns and, at the time of Franklin's appointment, was still at sea. He did not join the vessel until the autumn of 1800. Initially serving as a first-class volunteer, Franklin soon saw action in the Battle of Copenhagen in which the Polyphemus participated as part of Horatio Nelson's squadron. An expedition around the coast of Australia aboard HMS Investigator, commanded by his cousin Captain Matthew Flinders, followed, with Franklin now a midshipman.

The two later survived the sinking of HMS Porpoise on their return to England, Franklin continuing the journey aboard the Earl Camden, which under the Captaincy of Nathaniel Dance frightened off Admiral Charles de Durand-Linois at the Battle of Pulo Aura in the South China Sea on 14 February 1804. He was present at the Battle of Trafalgar in 1805 aboard HMS Bellerophon. During the War of 1812 against the United States, Franklin, now a lieutenant, served aboard HMS Bedford and was wounded during the Battle of Lake Borgne on 14 December 1814.

Franklin commanded HMS Trent in 1818 on a journey from London to Spitzbergen, now Svalbard. The overall expedition was commanded by Captain David Buchan on HMS Dorothea.

=== 1819: Coppermine expedition ===
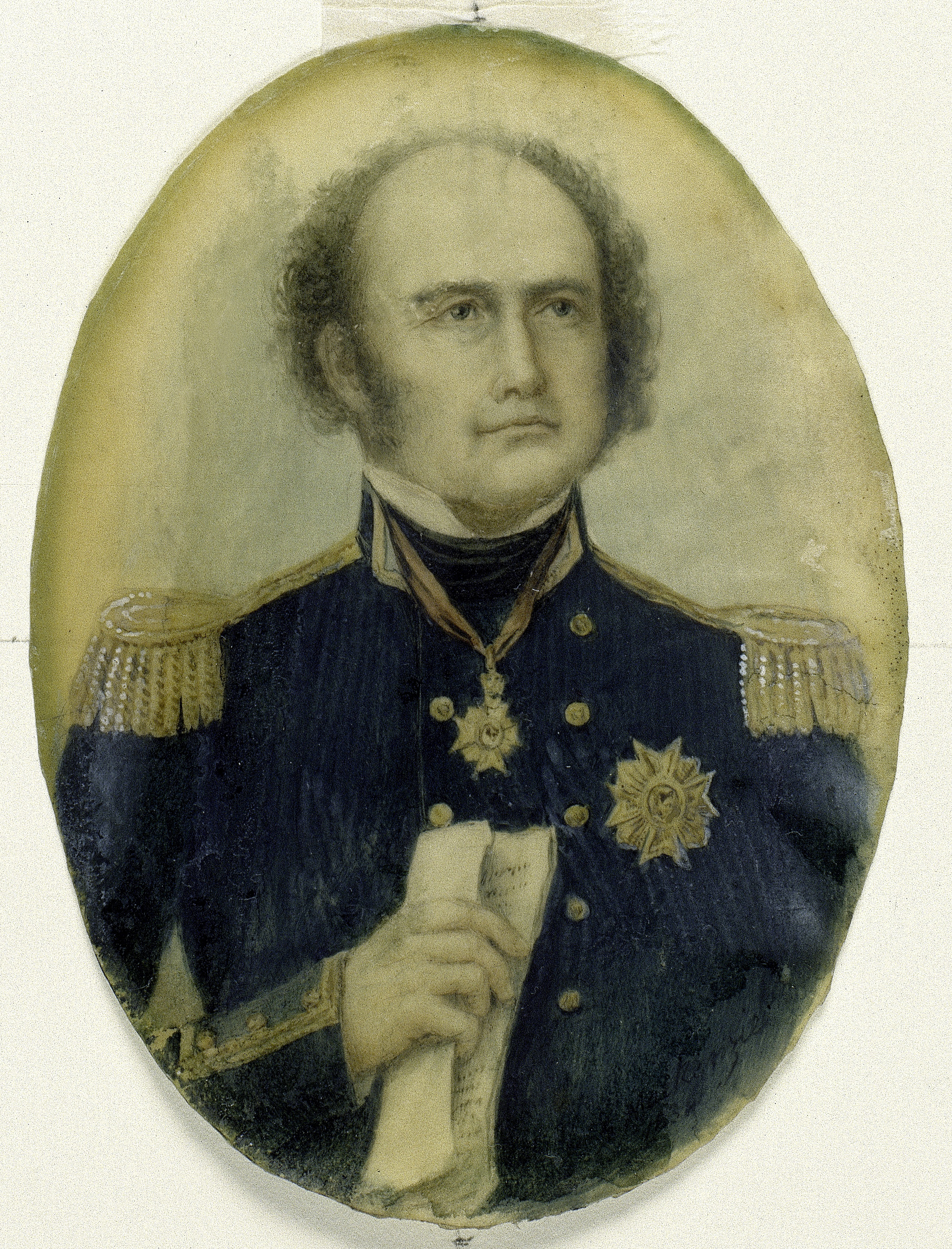
Sir John Franklin, c. 1835

In 1819, Franklin was chosen to lead the Coppermine expedition overland from Hudson Bay to chart the north coast of Canada eastwards from the mouth of the Coppermine River. On his 1819 expedition, Franklin fell into the Hayes River at Robinson Falls and was rescued by a member of his expedition about 90 m (100 yd) downstream.

Between 1819 and 1822, he lost 11 of the 20 men in his party. Most died of starvation or exhaustion, but there was also at least one murder and suggestions of cannibalism. The survivors were forced to eat lichen and even attempted to eat their own leather boots. This gained Franklin the nickname of "the man who ate his boots".

=== 1823: Marriage and third Arctic expedition ===
In 1823, after returning to England, Franklin married the poet Eleanor Anne Porden. Their daughter, Eleanor Isabella, was born the following year. His wife died of tuberculosis in 1825. Eleanor Isabella married the Reverend John Philip Gell in 1849. She died in 1860.

In 1825, he left for his second Canadian and third Arctic expedition, the Mackenzie River expedition. The goal this time was the mouth of the Mackenzie River from which he would follow the coast westward and possibly meet Frederick William Beechey who would try to sail northeast from the Bering Strait. With him was John Richardson who would follow the coast east from the Mackenzie to the mouth of the Coppermine River. The botanist Thomas Drummond was another scientist in Sir John Franklin's second land expedition. In 1828, he published his highly influencial exsiccata 'Musci Americani; or, specimens of the mosses collected in British North America, and chiefly among the Rocky Mountains, during the Second Land Arctic Expedition under the command of Captain Franklin, R.N. by Thomas Drummond, Assistant Naturalist.

At the same time, William Edward Parry would try to sail west from the Atlantic. (Beechey reached Point Barrow and Parry became frozen-in 900 mi [1,400 km] to the east. At this time, the only known points on the north coast were a hundred or so miles east from the Bering Strait, the mouth of the Mackenzie, Franklin's stretch east of the Coppermine, and a bit of the Gulf of Boothia which had been seen briefly from the land.) Supplies were better organised this time, in part because they were managed by Peter Warren Dease of the Hudson's Bay Company (HBC).

After reaching Great Slave Lake using the standard HBC route, Franklin took a reconnaissance trip 1,000 mi (1,600 km) down the Mackenzie and on 16 August 1825, became the second European to reach its mouth. He erected a flagpole with buried letters for Parry. He returned to winter at Fort Franklin (modern-day Délı̨nę) on Great Bear Lake. The following summer he went downriver and found the ocean frozen. He worked his way west for several hundred miles and gave up on 16 August 1826 at Return Reef when he was about 150 mi (240 km) east of Beechey's Point Barrow.

Reaching safety at Fort Franklin on 21 September 1826, he left on 20 February 1827 and spent the rest of the winter and spring at Fort Chipewyan. He reached Liverpool on the first of September 1827. Richardson's eastward journey was more successful. Franklin's diary from this expedition describes his men playing hockey on the ice of the Great Bear Lake; Délı̨nę, built on the site of Fort Franklin, thus considers itself to be one of the birthplaces of the sport.

On 5 November 1828, he married Jane Griffin, a friend of his first wife and a seasoned traveller who proved indomitable in the course of their life together. On 29 April 1829, he was knighted by George IV and the same year awarded the first Gold Medal of the Société de Géographie of France. On 25 January 1836, he was made Knight Commander of the Royal Guelphic Order and a Knight of the Greek Order of the Redeemer.

=== 1837: Lieutenant-Governor of Van Diemen's Land ===
Franklin was appointed Lieutenant Governor of Van Diemen's Land in 1837 but was removed from office in 1843. He is remembered by a significant landmark in the centre of Hobart—a statue of him dominates the park known as Franklin Square, which was the site of the original Government House. On the plinth below the statue appears Tennyson's epitaph:

Not here! The white north hath thy bones and thou
Heroic sailor soul
Art passing on thine happier voyage now
Toward no earthly pole

His wife worked to set up a university, which was eventually established in 1890, and a museum, credited to the Royal Society of Tasmania in 1843 under the leadership of her husband. Lady Franklin may have worked to have the Lieutenant-Governor's private botanical gardens, established in 1818, managed as a public resource. Lady Franklin also established a glyptotheque and surrounding lands to support it near Hobart. Sir John and Lady Jane Franklin took the daughter of an indigenous Australian woman whose community had been forcibly moved from Tasmania by the British. She was renamed Mathinna and was raised with their own daughter Eleanor, but the Franklins abandoned her at an orphanage in Tasmania when they returned to England in 1843.

The village of Franklin, on the Huon River, is named in his honour, as is the Franklin River on the West Coast of Tasmania, one of the better known Tasmanian rivers due to the Franklin Dam controversy.

Shortly after leaving his post as Lieutenant Governor of Van Diemen's Land, Franklin revisited a cairn on Arthurs Seat, a small mountain just inside Port Phillip Bay in Victoria, Australia, that he had visited as a midshipman with Captain Matthew Flinders in April 1802. On this trip he was accompanied by Captain Reid of The Briars and Andrew Murison McCrae of Arthurs Seat Station, now known as McCrae Homestead.

=== 1845: Northwest Passage expedition ===
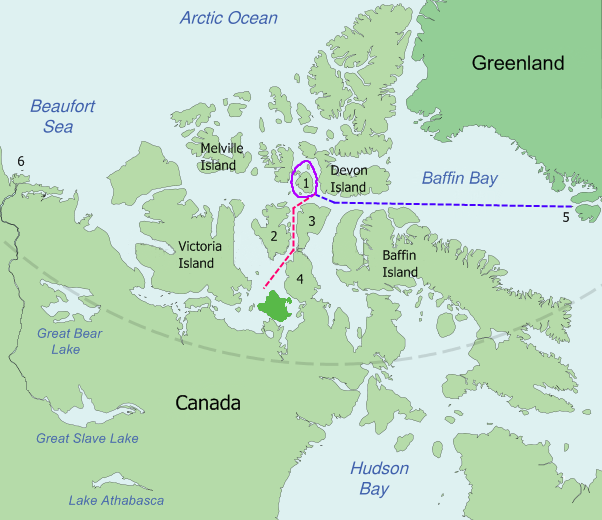
The routes that were thought likely to have been taken by HMS Erebus and HMS Terror, prior to their 2014–2016 rediscovery. King William Island is at centre, coloured a darker green, above the dotted line of the Arctic Circle. Disko Bay to Beechey Island, 1845 Around Cornwallis Island, 1845–46 Northwest off King William Island, 1846: 1. Cornwallis Island; 2. Prince of Wales Island; 3. Somerset Island; 4. Boothia Peninsula; 5. Disko Island; 6. Mackenzie River

Exploration of the Arctic coastal mainland after Franklin's second Arctic expedition had left less than 500 km (311 mi) of unexplored Arctic coastline. The British decided to send a well-equipped Arctic expedition to complete the charting of the Northwest Passage. After Sir James Clark Ross declined an offer to command the expedition, an invitation was extended to Franklin, who, despite being 59 years old, accepted what was to become Franklin's lost expedition.

A younger man, Commander James Fitzjames, was given command of HMS Erebus, and Franklin was named the expedition commander. Captain Francis Crozier, who had commanded HMS Terror during the Ross expedition of 1841–1844 to the Antarctic, was appointed executive officer and commander of Terror. Franklin was given command on 7 February 1845, and received official instructions on 5 May 1845.

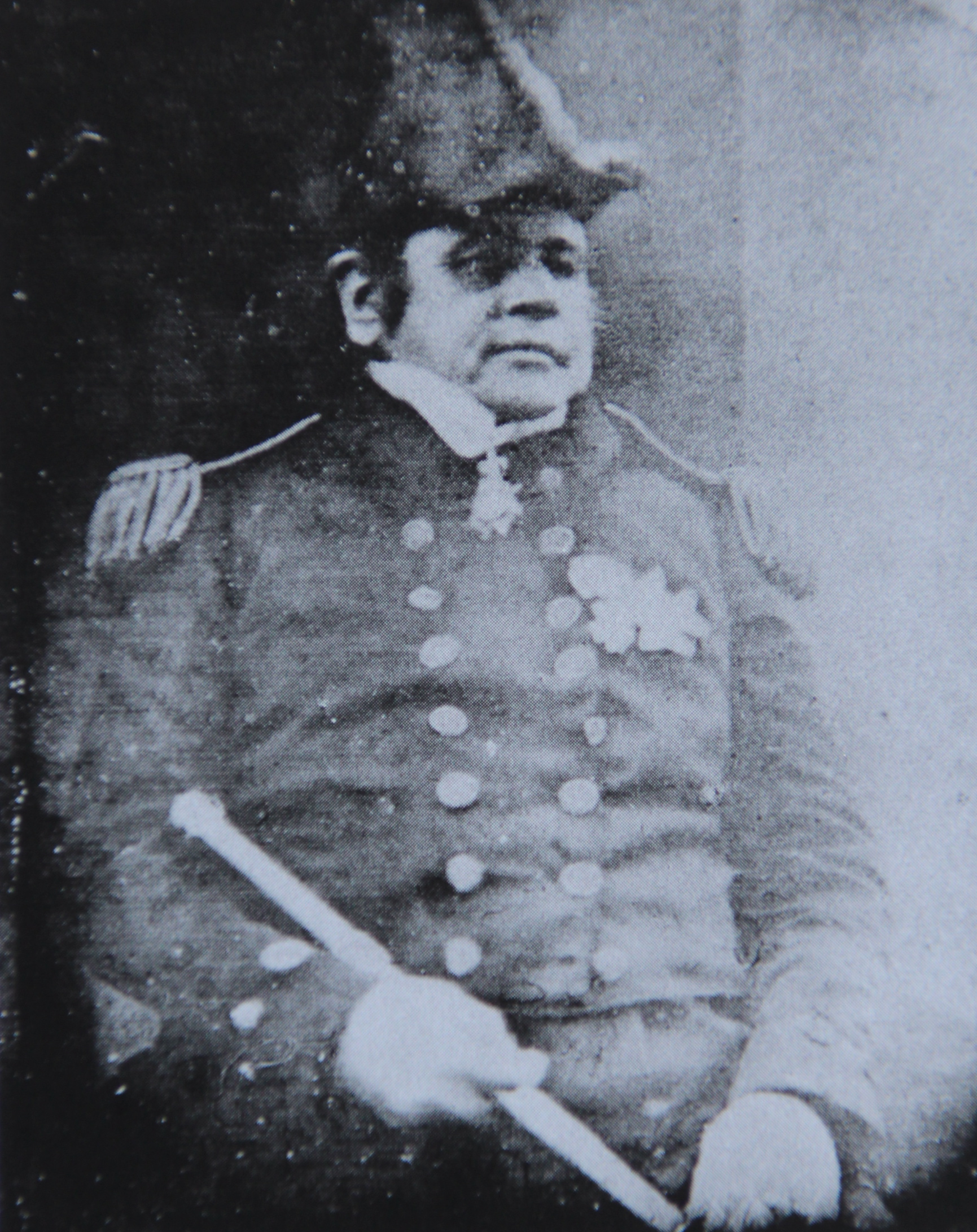
Daguerreotype photograph of Franklin taken in 1845, prior to the expedition's departure. He is wearing the 1843–1846 pattern Royal Navy undress tailcoat with cocked hat.

The crew was chosen by the Admiralty. Most of them were Englishmen, many were from northern England, and a small number were Irishmen and Scotsmen.

Erebus and Terror were sturdily built and were outfitted with recent inventions. These included steam engines from the London and Greenwich Railway that enabled the ships to make 4 knots (7.4 km/h; 4.6 mph) on their own power, a unique combined steam-based heating and distillation system for the comfort of the crew and to provide large quantities of fresh water for the engine's boilers, a mechanism that enabled the iron rudder and propeller to be drawn into iron wells to protect them from damage, ships' libraries of more than 1,000 books, and three years' worth of conventionally preserved or tinned preserved food supplies. The tinned preserved food was supplied by a cut-rate provisioner who was awarded the contract a few months before the ships were to sail.

Though the provisioner's "patent process" was sound, the haste with which he had prepared thousands of cans of food led to sloppily applied beads of solder on the cans' interior edges, allowing lead to leach into the food. Additionally, the water distillation system may have used lead piping and lead-soldered joints, which would have produced drinking water with a high lead content.

The Franklin Expedition set sail from Greenhithe, England, on 19 May 1845, with a crew of 24 officers and 110 men. The ships travelled north to Aberdeen and the Orkney Isles for supplies. From Scotland, the ships sailed to Greenland with HMS Rattler and a transport ship, Barretto Junior. After misjudging the location of Whitefish Bay on Disko Island, the expedition backtracked and finally harboured in that far north outpost to prepare for the rest of their voyage. Five crew members were discharged and sent home on the Rattler and Barretto Junior, reducing the ships' final crew size to 129. The expedition was last seen by Europeans on 26 July 1845, when Captain Dannett of the whaler Prince of Wales encountered Terror and Erebus moored to an iceberg in Lancaster Sound.

It is now believed that the expedition wintered on Beechey Island in 1845–46. Terror and Erebus became trapped in ice off King William Island in September 1846. According to a note later found on that island, Franklin died there on 11 June 1847, but the exact location of his grave is unknown.

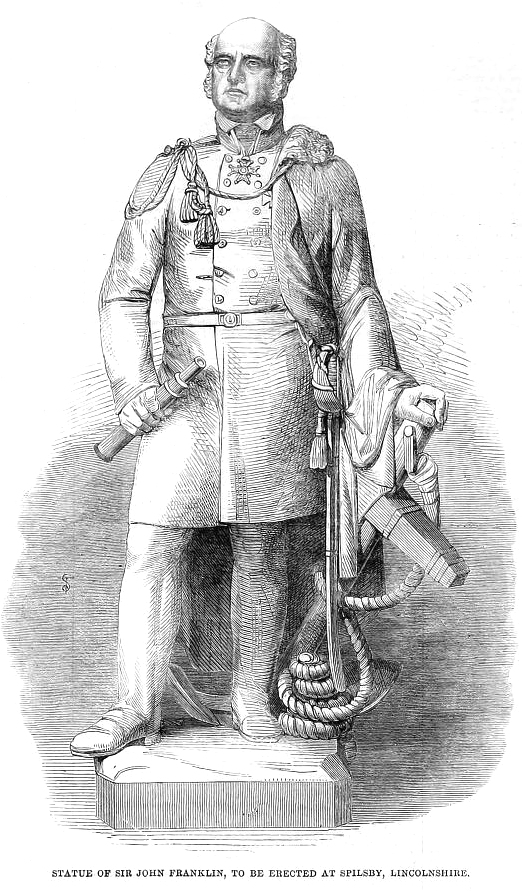
Engraving of Charles Bacon's statue of Franklin in Spilsby in 1861, prior to its installation

After two years and no word from the expedition, Lady Franklin urged the Admiralty to send a search party. Because the crew carried supplies for three years, the Admiralty waited another year before launching a search and offering a £20,000 reward (equivalent to £1,793,914 in 2025) for finding the expedition. The money and Franklin's fame led to many searches.

At one point, ten British and two American ships, USS Advance and USS Rescue, headed for the Arctic. Eventually, more ships and men were lost looking for Franklin than in the expedition itself. Ballads such as "Lady Franklin's Lament", commemorating Lady Franklin's search for her lost husband, became popular.

In the summer of 1850, several expeditions, including three from England as well as one from the United States, joined in the search. They converged off the east coast of Beechey Island, where the first relics of the Franklin expedition were found, including the gravesites of three of Franklin's crewmen. Many presumed Franklin was still alive, and he was promoted to Rear-Admiral of the Blue in October 1852, an example of an unintentional posthumous promotion.

In 1854, the Scottish explorer John Rae, while surveying the Boothia Peninsula for the Hudson's Bay Company, discovered the true fate of the Franklin party from talking to Inuit hunters. He was told both ships had become icebound, and the men had tried to reach safety on foot but had succumbed to cold, and some had resorted to cannibalism. Forensic evidence of cut marks on the skeletal remains of crew members found on King William Island during the late 20th century somewhat supported the Inuit accounts of reported cannibalism.

Rae's report to the Admiralty was leaked to the press, which led to widespread revulsion in Victorian society, enraged Franklin's widow, and condemned Rae to ignominy. Lady Franklin's efforts to eulogise her husband, with support from the British Establishment, led to a further 25 searches over the next four decades, none of which would add much further information of note regarding Franklin and his men, but contributed hugely to the mapping of the Arctic.

In the mid-1980s, Owen Beattie, a University of Alberta professor of anthropology, began a 10-year series of scientific studies that showed that the Beechey Island crew had most likely died of pneumonia and perhaps tuberculosis. Toxicological reports indicated that lead poisoning was also a possible factor.

In 1997, more than 140 years after his report, Dr. Rae's account was finally vindicated; cut marks caused by blades were discovered on the bones of some of the crew found on King William Island, strongly suggesting that conditions had become so dire that some crew members resorted to cannibalism. Evidence suggestive of breakage and boiling of bones, characteristic of efforts to extract marrow, was subsequently identified. It appeared from these studies that a combination of bad weather, years locked in ice, poisoned food, botulism, starvation, and disease, including scurvy, had killed everyone in the Franklin party. In October 2009, marine archaeologist Robert Grenier outlined recent discoveries of sheet metal and copper which have been recovered from 19th-century Inuit hunting sites. Grenier firmly believes these pieces of metal once belonged to the Terror and formed the protective plating of the ship's hull.

A quote from the British newspaper The Guardian states:

After studying 19th-century Inuit oral testimony – which included eyewitness descriptions of starving, exhausted men staggering through the snow without condescending to ask local people how they survived in such a wilderness – [Grenier] believes the 19th-century official accounts that all the surviving expedition members abandoned their ice-locked ships are wrong. He believes both ships drifted southwards, with at least two crew remaining until the final destruction of their vessels. One broke up, but Inuit hunters arriving at their summer hunting grounds reported discovering another ship floating in fresh ice in a cove. The ship, probably the Terror, was very neat and orderly, but the Inuit descended into the darkness of the hull with their seal-oil lamps, where they found a tall dead man in an inner cabin. Grenier believes it was there they recovered the copper, which was more valuable than gold to them, and tools, including shears from the ship's workshop with which to work it. Hauntingly, they also reported that one of the masts was on fire. Grenier wonders if what they saw was the funnel from the galley still smoking from a meal cooked that morning before the last of Franklin's men disappeared from history.

== Legacy ==
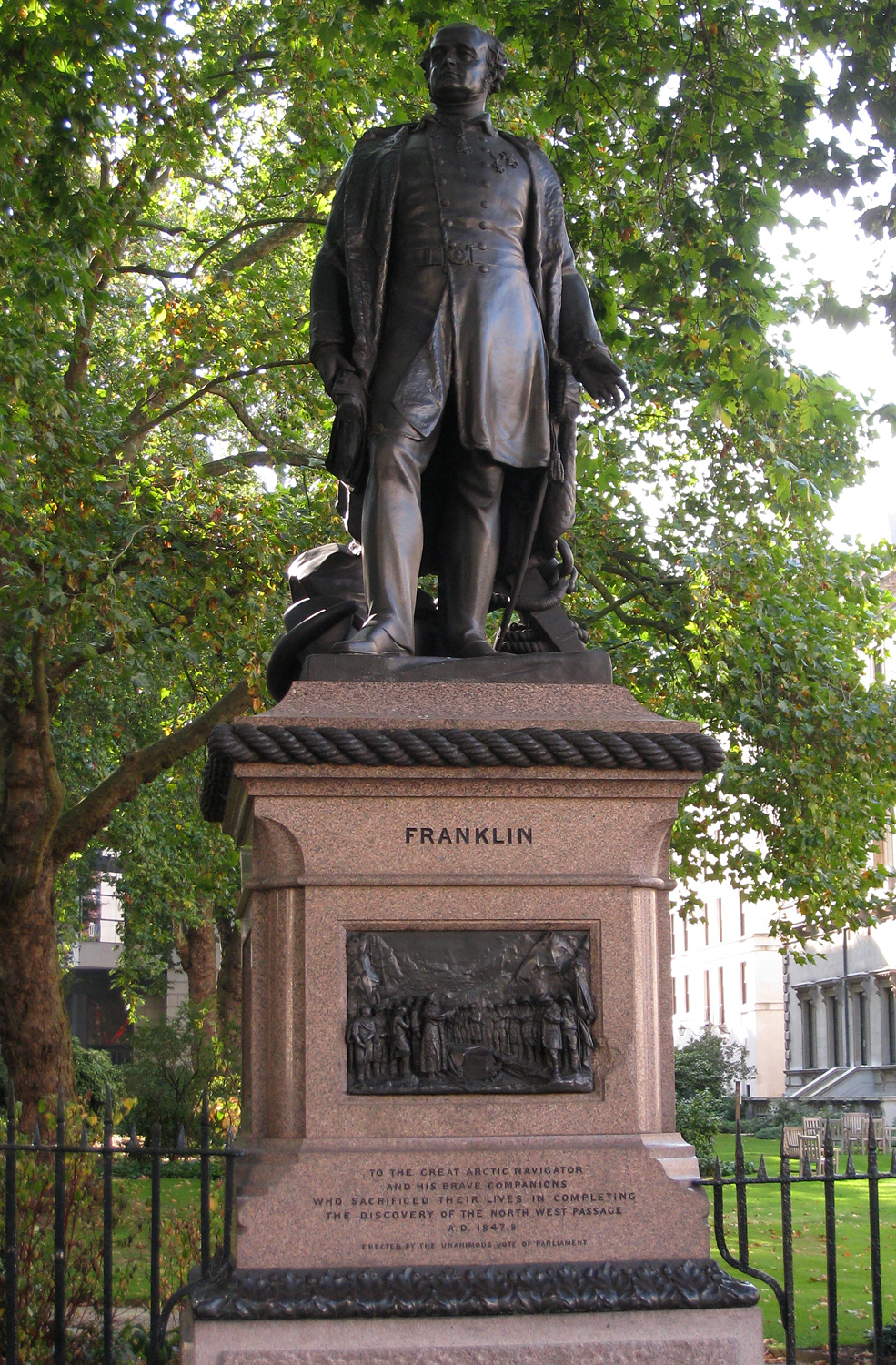
"Discoverer of the North West Passage" – a disputed or exaggerated claim on Matthew Noble's 1866 statue of Franklin, Waterloo Place, London

A memorial to Franklin was set up almost immediately on the assumption of his death. This is in Westminster Abbey to a design of Matthew Noble.

For years after the loss of the Franklin party, the media of the Victorian era portrayed Franklin as a hero who led his men in the quest for the Northwest Passage. A statue of Franklin in his home town bears the inscription: "Discoverer of the North West Passage". There are also statues of Franklin outside the Athenaeum Club in London and Franklin Square, Hobart, the state capital of Tasmania. There is also a memorial to him in the Chapel of St Michael at Westminster Abbey.

Many geographic locales are named after Franklin, among them Franklin Island in Antarctica, Franklin Island in Greenland, Franklin Strait in northern Canada, Franklin, Quebec, Franklin Sound north of Tasmania, and the Franklin River and the town of Franklin in Tasmania, as well as many streets and schools, including École Sir John Franklin High School in Yellowknife, NT and Sir John Franklin School, Calgary, AB. The oceanographic research vessel Northern Franklin and the Canadian Coast Guard vessel CCGS Sir John Franklin both bear his name. The wintering site of Franklin's second Canadian expedition, in Délı̨nę, Northwest Territories, was designated a National Historic Site of Canada in 1996. The explorer was also memorialised when one of Canada's Northwest Territories subdivisions was named the District of Franklin. Franklin's gull (Leucophaeus pipixcan) of North America was also named after him.

In 2009, a special service of Thanksgiving was held in the chapel at the Royal Naval College to accompany the rededication of the national monument to Sir John Franklin. It was a celebration of the contributions made by the United Kingdom in the charting of northern Canada, and honoured the loss of life in the pursuit of geographical discovery. The service also marked the 150th anniversary of Francis McClintock's voyage aboard the yacht Fox, and that expedition's return to London with news of the tragedy.

Franklin's time in Tasmania was dramatised in the play Jane, My Love and its radio adaptation The Franklins of Hobart Town.

=== Rediscovery ===
In September 2014, the wreck of HMS Erebus was rediscovered in Wilmot and Crampton Bay near the Adelaide Peninsula, and, in September 2016, the wreck of HMS Terror was discovered in Terror Bay on the south coast of King William Island, in "pristine" condition. The wrecks were found many miles south of their last known location off the northwest coast of King William Island; archaeologists believe the Terror must have been crewed and sailed to its new location, as the anchor was used and it was sailed through a maze of islands and channels. The wrecks are designated as the Wrecks of HMS Erebus and HMS Terror National Historic Site, with the precise locations of the discoveries undisclosed.

== Sources ==
- Lamb, G. F. (1956). Franklin: Happy Voyager. London: Ernest Benn. OCLC 250937261.
- O'Byrne, William Richard (1849). "Franklin, John (a)" . A Naval Biographical Dictionary . John Murray – via Wikisource.
- Traill, H. D. (1896). The Life of Sir John Franklin, R.N. London: John Murray. OCLC 316480873.
