= Statue of Robert Falcon Scott, London =

Statue in London

Coordinates: 51.5069°N 0.1319°W

Captain Robert Falcon Scott
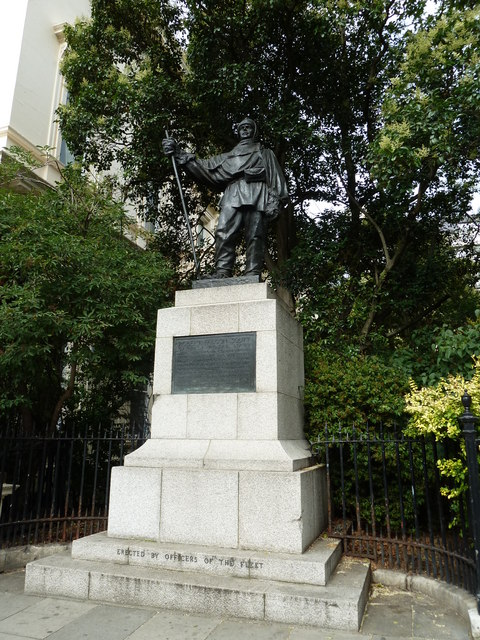
- Artist: Kathleen Scott
- Completion date: 1915
- Subject: Robert Falcon Scott
- Location: London

Listed Building – Grade II
- Official name: Statue of Captain Robert Falcon Scott
- Designated: 5 February 1970
- Reference no.: 1357334

The Statue of Captain Robert Falcon Scott is a Grade II listed statue on Waterloo Place in London. The sculpture is by Scott's wife, Kathleen Scott.

Robert Falcon Scott was an Antarctic explorer. He and his crew would die during the Terra Nova Expedition, having been beaten to the South Pole by Roald Amundsen.

Funds for the monument were raised by officers of the Navy. Originally, the design of the memorial would be a symbolic grouping with Courage and Patriotism. Kathleen's design of the statue would represent her husband in Antarctic gear. The monument was unveiled in 1915 by Arthur Balfour and a plaque in 1923 would be added commemorating Scott alongside Wilson, Bower, Oates and Evans of his company.

A marble replica stands in Christchurch, New Zealand.
