= Statue of Sir John Franklin =

Statue in London

Coordinates: 51.5065°N 0.1323°W

Sir John Franklin
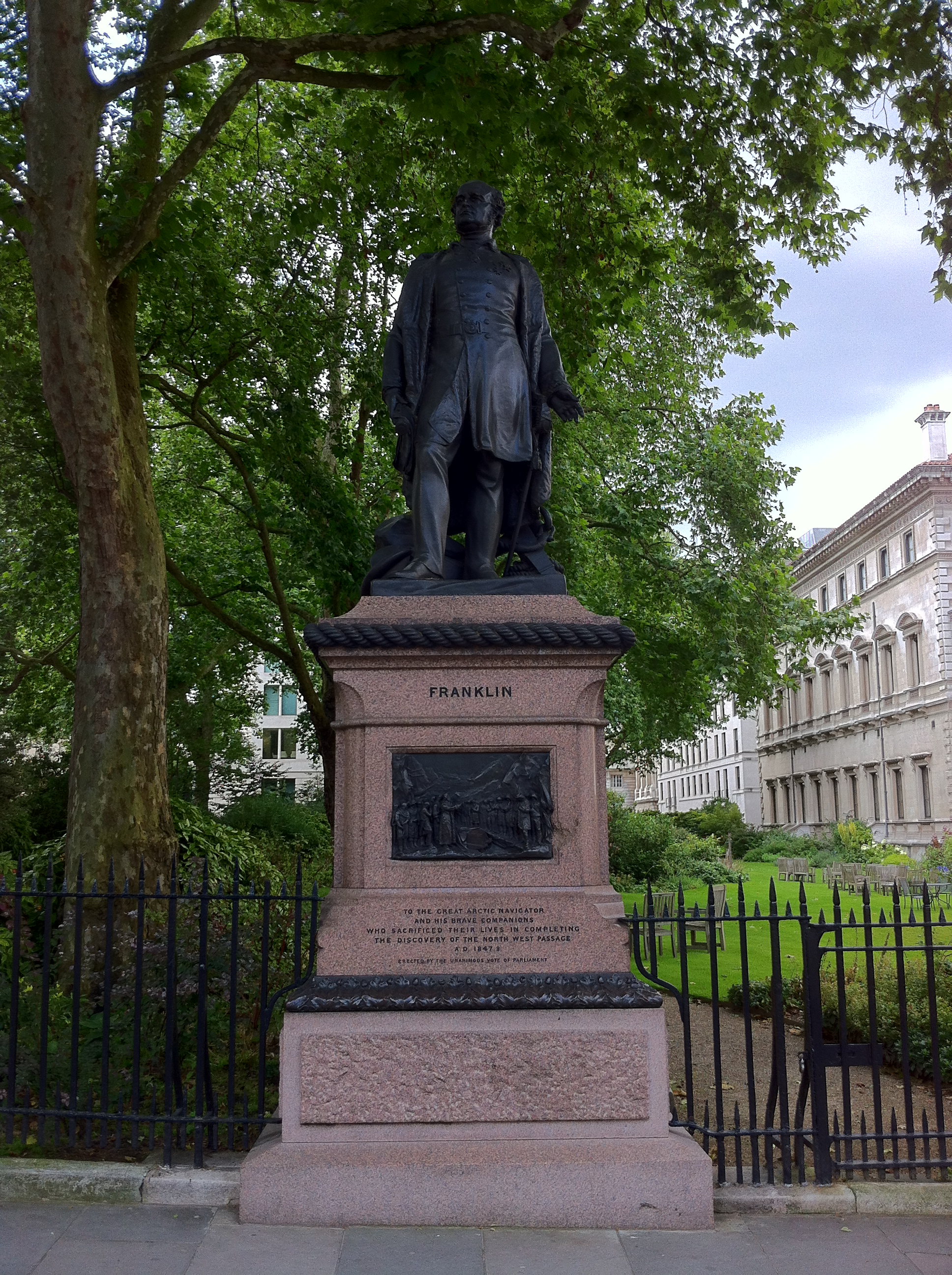
- Artist: Matthew Noble
- Completion date: 1866
- Subject: John Franklin
- Location: London

Listed Building – Grade II
- Official name: Statue of Sir John Franklin
- Designated: 5 February 1970
- Reference no.: 1066145

The statue of Sir John Franklin is a Grade II listed statue by the Athenaeum Club on Waterloo Place.

John Franklin was a British Naval Officer and Arctic expleror. He fought in the battles of Copenhagen and Trafalgar. The monument names all the members of the failed Franklin's lost expedition, none of which would return. The expedition would be termed as Franklin's company as those who "forged the last link with their lives" of the Northwest Passage. Franklin and his expedition would be popular in folklore, being the inspiration for a number of poems. The statue would often serve as a site where a crowd would gather for a public telling of the story of Franklin's expedition.

The statue was designed by Matthew Noble and completed in 1866. Franklin is depicted in naval uniform. As much of the detail surrounding Franklin's expedition is unknown, it is a belief held by some that Franklin did indeed discover the Northwest Passage, a statement which is inscribed on the plinth.
