= Statue of Sir Keith Park =

Statue in London, England

Coordinates: 51.5067°N 0.1324°W

Sir Keith Park
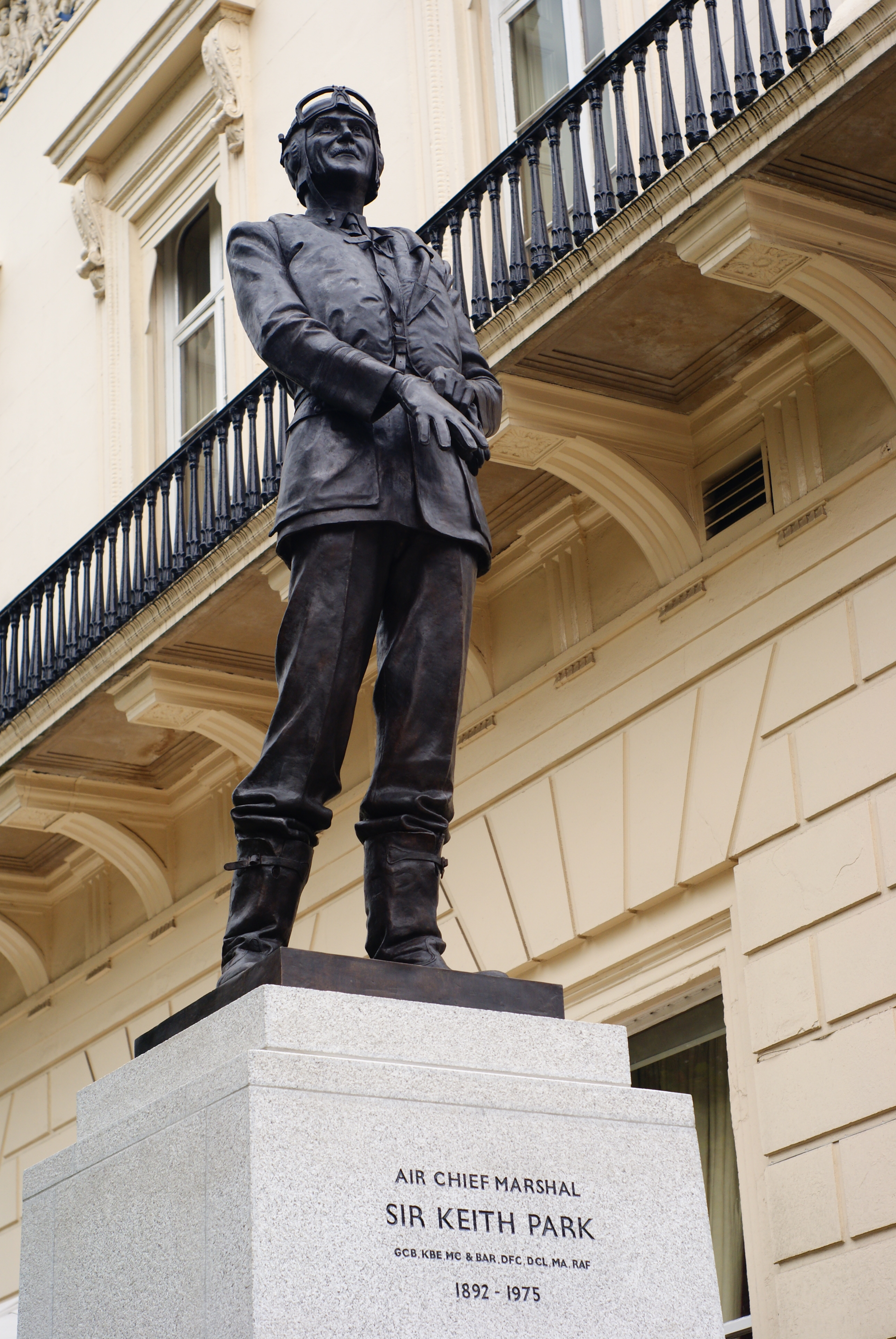
- Artist: Les Johnson
- Completion date: 2010
- Subject: Keith Park
- Location: London

The statue of Sir Keith Park is a statue by the Athenaeum Club on Waterloo Place.

A three-year campaign to commemorate Keith Park originally aimed at erecting a statue of Park in Trafalgar Square resulted in the creation of a memorial. The statue was designed by Les Johnson and unveiled in 2010 on the 70th anniversary of the Battle of Britain. It depicts Park, a member of the RAF who defended England in the battle, wearing a life jacket and flying gloves. With Park himself a New Zealander, the statue stands not far from New Zealand House.

A temporary version of the statue occupied the Fourth plinth in 2009.
