= Statue of Sir John Fox Burgoyne =

Statue in London, England

Coordinates: 51.5064°N 0.1322°W

Sir John Fox Burgoyne
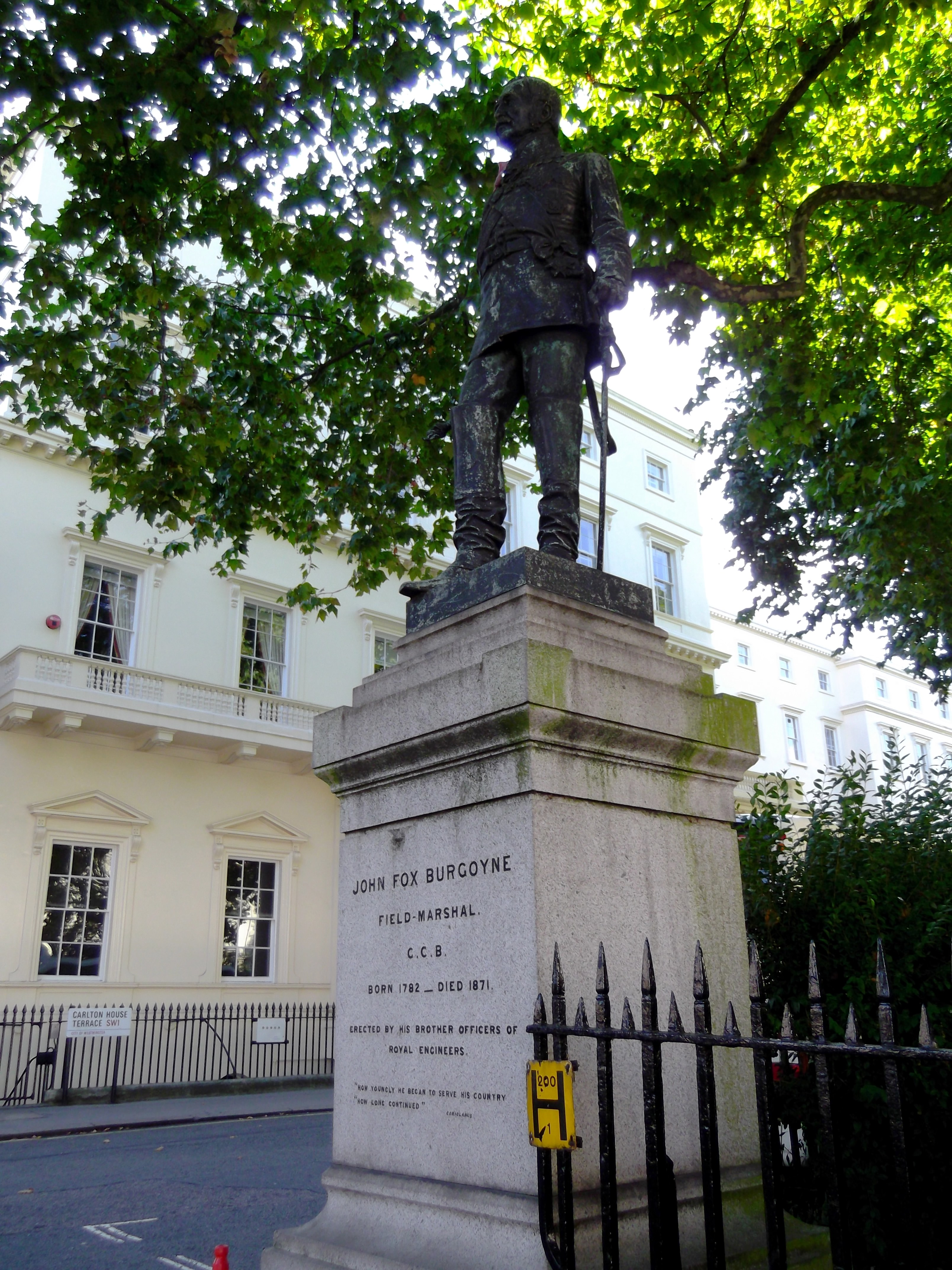
- Statue of John Fox Burgoyne, in London
- Artist: Joseph Edgar Boehm
- Completion date: 1877
- Subject: John Fox Burgoyne
- Location: London

Listed Building – Grade II
- Official name: Statue of Sir John Fox Burgoyne
- Designated: 5 February 1970
- Reference no.: 1066144

The statue of Sir John Fox Burgoyne is a Grade II listed statue on the western flank of Waterloo Place in central London. A work of the sculptor Joseph Edgar Boehm, it was unveiled in 1877. It is one of several statues on the street.

John Fox Burgoyne was a British Army officer who served in the Peninsular and Crimean War, later becoming a field marshal in 1869. The statue's inscription includes a quotation from Shakespeare's Coriolanus, "How youngly he began to serve his country, how long continued", reflecting Burgoyne's extensive career in the army, serving just shy of seven decades.
