= Equestrian statue of Edward VII, London =

Bronze equestrian statue in London

Coordinates: 51.5067°N 0.1321°W

Equestrian statue of Edward VII
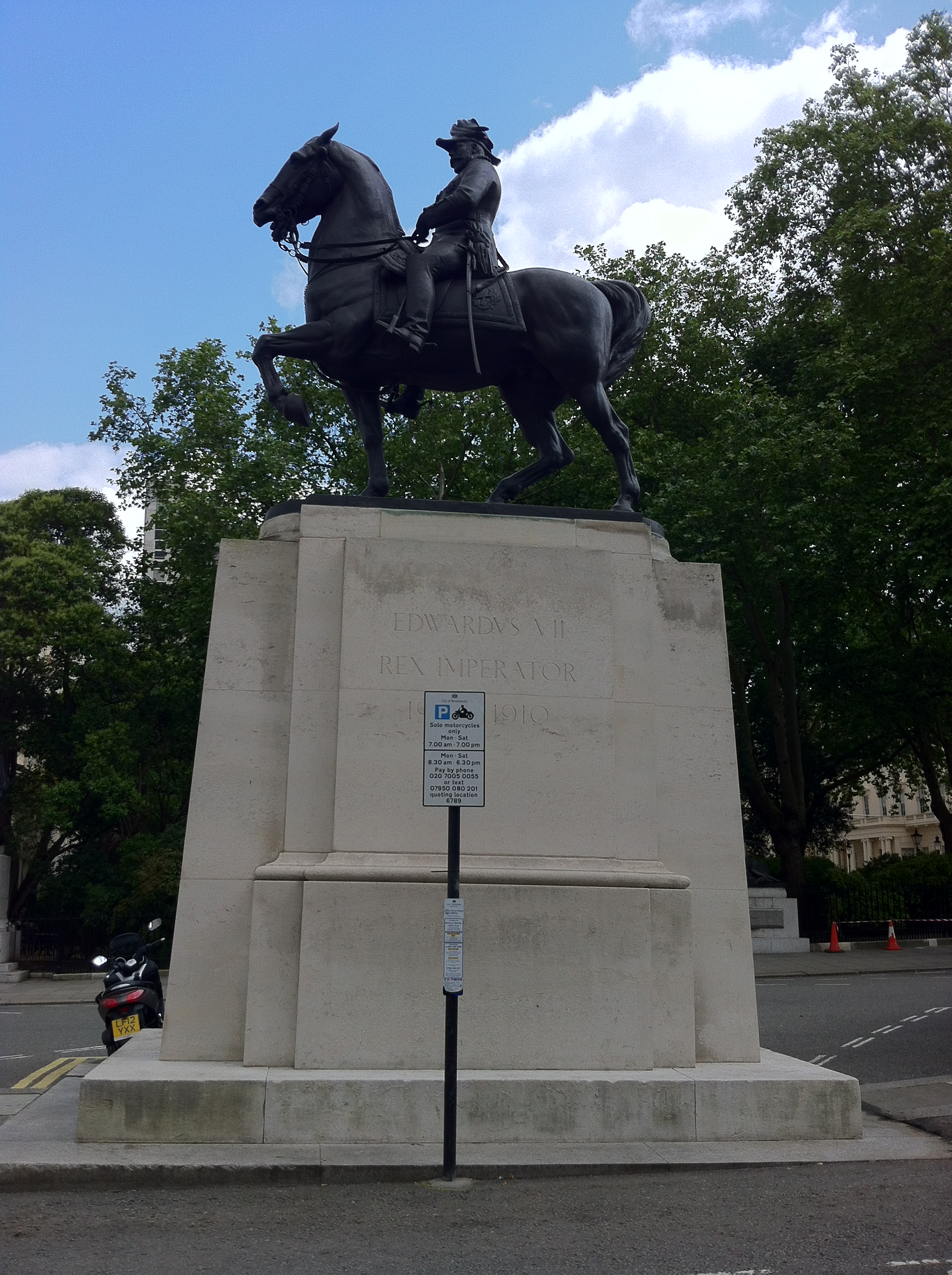
- Artist: Bertram Mackennal
- Completion date: 1921
- Subject: Edward VII
- Location: London

Listed Building – Grade II
- Official name: Statue of King Edward VII
- Designated: 5 February 1970
- Reference no.: 1273712

The equestrian statue of Edward VII is a Grade II listed statue that sits just north of the Duke of York Column on Waterloo Place. The street has a number of memorials and monuments, and a statue of Robert Napier had previously stood on the site since 1891.

The statue was commissioned in 1912 but delayed by the First World War to be eventually completed in 1921 by Australian sculptor Bertram Mackennal. It is in bronze upon a Portland stone pedestal, depicting Edward VII wearing Field Marshal's uniform. This choice was perhaps made to reflect Britain's participation and victory in the war despite it being after Edward VII's death.

Originally there had been plans for a larger and more elaborate memorial, and arguments over where to site it. Green Park and St James Park were raised as possible candidate but both met with significant resistance. Eventually, on the advice of George V such plans would be replaced by the equestrian statue that ended up put up in Waterloo Place.
