= Bertram Mackennal =

Australian sculptor and medallist

Sir Bertram Mackennal KCVO RA
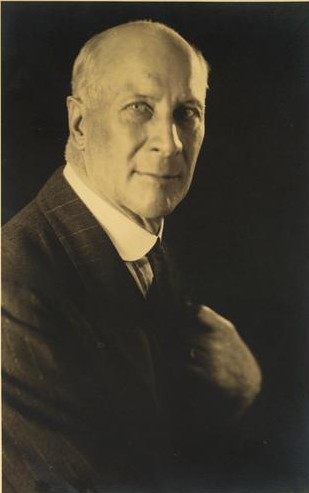
- Sir Bertram Mackennal
- Born: Edgar Bertram Mackennal; 12 June 1863; Melbourne, Victoria, Australia
- Died: 10 October 1931 (aged 68); Watcombe Hall, near Torquay, England, United Kingdom
- Education: National Gallery School
- Known for: Sculptor
- Spouse: Agnes Spooner (m. 1884)
- Children: 1

Sir Edgar Bertram Mackennal KCVO RA (12 June 1863 – 10 October 1931) was an Australian sculptor who achieved international success, receiving substantial royal patronage in the United Kingdom in the late-19th and early-20th centuries. Mackennal worked within the classically derived sculptural conventions of his time and is best known for his stylised allegorical nudes and themes from classical mythology. In 1909, Mackennal was the first Australian to be elected an Associate of the Royal Academy and became a full Academician in 1922. He was also the first Australian artist to be knighted, in 1921.

== Career ==
Mackennal was born on 12 June 1863 in Fitzroy, Melbourne, the second son of John Simpson Mackennal (1832-1901) and his wife Annabella, née Hyde, both Scottish. Mackennal was educated at the Melbourne Model School and King's College. His initial training was undertaken by his father, a locally prominent architectural modeller and sculptor, and was reinforced by studies at the National Gallery School of Design under O. R. Campbell from 1878. He travelled to England, where, in 1884, he married Agnes Spooner, and then Italy and France before being appointed the head of modelling and design at the Coalport Potteries, Shropshire in 1886 and exhibited his first relief at the Royal Academy that year.

Mackennal returned to Australia to fulfil commissions awarded for the Parliament House, Melbourne; however, he was unable to find sufficient work and returned to Paris where he exhibited Circe in the Paris Salon to critical acclaim and thereafter he was awarded private commissions followed by others from public bodies for statues of the recently-deceased Queen Victoria in England, India, and Australia. In 1907 and 1908, two of his works were acquired by the Tate Gallery, confirming his reputation as upcoming young sculptor, followed by a commission for the design of medals for the 1908 London Olympic Games, and then further official royal patronage for commissions of various members of the British Royal Family in England and throughout the Commonwealth.

He returned to Australia in the mid-1920s were he earned further commissions, including at St Mary's Cathedral and a new war memorial at the Cenotaph in Martin Place, both in Sydney. He returned to England and died suddenly on 10 October 1931, and was buried in Devon.

== Honours ==
Appointed as an Member of the Royal Victorian Order in 1912 and knighted in 1921 – the first Australian-born artist to be so honoured; Mackennal was elected a member of the Royal Academy in 1922.

== Notable works ==
As of 2026, Mackennal's sculptures are held in the permanent collections of the National Gallery of Victoria – nine sculptures and one relief are held; and the Art Gallery of New South Wales – fourteen sculptures and one relief are held.

| Name of work | Image | Completed | Type | Location | Notes |
|---|---|---|---|---|---|
| The Five Foolish Virgins | | 1886 | Relief | Exhibited at the Royal Academy | |
| Sculptured reliefs | | 1887 | Reliefs | Parliament House, Melbourne, Australia | |
| Louis Buvelot | | 1892 | Marble bust | A gift from the estate of Madame Buvelot to the National Gallery of Victoria, 1902 | |
| Head of a Saint | | 1892 | Marble bust | Exhibited at Paris Salon (1892), single bronze relief also in existence from 1892 | |
| Circe | | 1893 | Bronze figure | Exhibited at Paris Salon (1893), awarded Mention honourable; the National Gallery of Victoria acquired a figure that is 205.5 cm × 79.4 cm × 93.4 cm (80.9 in × 31.3 in × 36.8 in), possibly in 1910; while the Art Gallery of New South Wales acquired a bronze statuette that is 57.5 cm × 22 cm × 27 cm (22.6 in × 8.7 in × 10.6 in) in 1970 | |
| Sarah Bernhardt | | c. 1892 – c. 1893 | Bronze relief | Exhibited at Paris Salon (1894); acquired by the Art Gallery of New South Wales in 1944 | |
| Truth | | 1894 | Bronze statuette | Acquired by the Art Gallery of New South Wales in 1974 as part of their permanent collection | |
| For She Sitteth on a Seat in the High Places of the City (Rahab) | | 1895 | | unknown | |
| Figure over doorway | | c. 1895 | Sculpture | Mercantile Chambers, Collins Street, Melbourne, Australia | |
| Pediment | | 1890 | Pediment | New Government Offices, Whitehall, London, England | |
| Oceania | | 1897 | | Union, University & Schools Club, Sydney, Australia | |
| Melba | | 1899 | Marble bust on pedestal | Initially at the Royal Opera House, Covent Garden, London; gifted by Dame Nellie Melba to the National Gallery of Victoria, 1900 | |
| Queen Victoria | | 1897–1900 | Marble statue on stone pedestal | Ballarat, Victoria, Australia | |
| Queen Victoria | | 1900–1902 | Seated bronze statue | The statue was originally erected under the marble Pavillion at Charing Cross, Lahore, now officially Shahrah-e-Quaid-e-Azam, looking down Queens Road. The statue was removed from the pavilion in 1951 and replaced by a bronze replica of the Quran on the eve of the Islamic Summit Conference in 1974. The statue is now located on display at the Lahore Museum, Pakistan | |
| Springthorpe Memorial | | 1901 | Sculptured memorial | Boroondara General Cemetery, Melbourne, Australia | |
| Sir William John Clarke | | 1901 | Life-sized marble statue | Treasury Gardens, Melbourne, Australia | |
| The Dancer | | 1904 | Life-sized bronze statue | Art Gallery of New South Wales collection | |
| Victory | | 1903 | Boer War Memorial | Highbury Fields, Islington, England | |
| Glory | | 1905 | Boer War Memorial | Highbury Fields, Islington, England | |
| Queen Victoria | | 1905 | Marble statue on stone pedestal | Blackburn Cathedral, Blackburn, England | |
| War (Bellona or Victory) | | 1906 | Bronze bust | Sculpture Garden, Australian War Memorial, Canberra, Australia | |
| Sir Peter Nicol Russell | | 1906–1909 | Bronze, granite and marble memorial statue | East Finchley Cemetery, London, England | |
| Sir Peter Nicol Russell | | 1906–1909 | Bronze, granite and marble memorial statue | University of Sydney, Australia | |
| The Earth and the Elements | | 1907 | Marble group | Tate Gallery collection | |
| Sir William Howard Russell | | 1907 | Bust | The Crypt, St Paul's Cathedral, London, England | |
| Olympic Games Medals | | 1908 | Medals | 1908 London Olympic Games | |
| Diana Wounded | | 1908 | Bronze | Acquired by the Tate Gallery as part of their collection | |
| King George V coinage, medals, and postage stamps | | 1910 | Coins, medals, stamps | London, England | |
| Tomb for Edward VII (with Edward Lutyens) | | 1910 | Tomb | St George's Chapel at Windsor Castle, England | |
| National Memorial to Thomas Gainsborough | | | Memorial | Sudbury, Suffolk, England | |
| Apollo | | | | Taplow Court, Buckinghamshire, England | |
| King George V | | 1916 | Marble portrait statue | Rashtrapati Bhavan, New Delhi, India (Note: Formerly situated at the Flower Bazaar Police Station, Madras.) | |
| King Edward VII | | 1916 | Bronze equestrian statue mounted on archway | Victoria Memorial Hall, Calcutta, India | |
| King Edward VII | | 1920 | Bronze equestrian statue | Queen Victoria Gardens, Melbourne, Australia | |
| King Edward VII | | 1920 | Bronze statue and associated figures | Adelaide, South Australia | |
| King Edward VII statue | | 1921 | Bronze equestrian statue | Waterloo Place, London, England | |
| Parliamentary War Memorial | | 1922 | War memorial | London, England | |
| Blackburn War Memorial | | 1922 | War memorial | Corporation Park, Blackburn, Lancashire, England | |
| War Memorial | | | War memorial | Cliveden House, Buckinghamshire, England | |
| Here I Am | | 1923 | Bronze figure | Commissioned by Eton College as a war memorial for WWI; acquired by the National Gallery of Victoria for their collection, 2006. | |
| Phoebus Driving the Horses of the Sun | | 1923 | Pediment figures | Australia House, The Strand, London, England | |
| Mother Courage | | 1923 | 1914–1918 War Memorial | Caledonian Club, Belgravia, London, England (Note: Unveiled by Vice President, Field Marshal Earl Haig, with Sir Bertram in attendance.) | |
| Cardinal Moran and Archbishop Kelly | | | Statues | St Mary's Cathedral, Sydney, Australia | |
| Shakespeare Memorial | | 1926 | Statue | Shakespeare Place, Sydney, Australia; a bronze statuette of Shakespeare, dated c. 1926, is held in the permanent collection of the Art Gallery of New South Wales | |
| Sydney Cenotaph | | 1929 | War memorial sculpture | Martin Place, Sydney, Australia | |
| Mary Curzon, Baroness Curzon of Kedleston | | 1931 | Tomb effigy | All Saints' Church, Kedleston, Derbyshire, England | |
| George Curzon, 1st Marquess Curzon of Kedleston | | 1931 | Monument | All Saints' Church, Kedleston, Derbyshire, England | |
| Marquess Curzon | | 1931 | Granite pedestal; life-size bronze statue | Carlton House Terrace, London, England | |
| Desert Mounted Corps Memorial | | 1931 | Memorial | Mount Clarence, Albany, Western Australia; previously at Port Said, Egypt; designed by Charles Web Gilbert and completed by Mackennal following Gilbert's sudden death in 1925 | |

== See also ==
- Visual arts of Australia

== Notes ==
| Preceded by George William de Saulles | Coins of the pound sterling Obverse sculptor 1910 | Succeeded by Thomas Humphrey Paget |
