= Queen's Park, Bolton =

Park in Bolton, Greater Manchester, England

Queen's Park
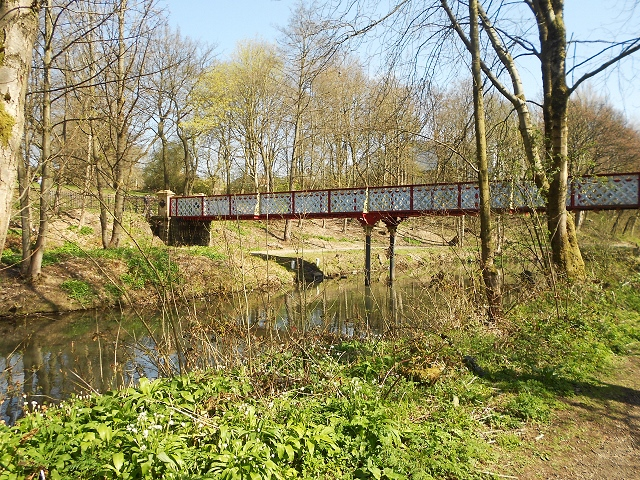
- Dobson Bridge in Queen's Park

- Location within Greater Manchester
- Type: Public park
- Location: Bolton, Greater Manchester, England
- OS grid: SD707093
- Coordinates: 53°34′45″N 2°26′41″W
- Opened: 24 May 1866
- Operator: Bolton MBC
- Status: Open all year

Queen's Park is a roughly circular 22 acres (8.9 ha) Victorian park lying on sloping ground to the north-west of Bolton town centre, in Greater Manchester, England. Opened as Bolton Park on 24 May 1866 by Lord Bradford it was renamed in 1897 in honour of Queen Victoria's Diamond Jubilee.

The park contains flowerbeds, duck ponds, and a children's play area and the River Croal runs through its lower area. A special feature is a series of grade II listed statues on the central terrace, including one of former British prime minister Benjamin Disraeli, John Fielding, a cotton Trade Unionist and James Dorrian, a popular Irish-born local doctor. The entrance lodge, now a cafe, is also a listed building, as is the cenotaph.

== History ==
The park was created as part of the works included in the Bolton Improvement Act 1864 (27 & 28 Vict. c. cci) on pasture land purchased from the Earl of Bradford and designed by William Henderson.

The park was opened as "Bolton Park" on 24 May 1866 by the Earl of Bradford. The name was changed to Queen's Park in 1897 to commemorate Queen Victoria's Diamond Jubilee.

Since its creation some of the original features have been lost, including the principal pavilion building but many original features have either been retained or restored such as the bandstand, the fountain, promenade terrace, sunken garden, and the cenotaph.

Queen's Park also has an extremely popular children's playground and a cafe with toilet facilities.

The park once also had a natural history museum, the Chadwick Museum, started in 1878 by Richard Knill Freeman and opened in 1884. It was funded by a bequest of Samuel Chadwick, whose statue stands in Victoria Square, Bolton. The building was demolished in 1957 after the museum's contents were moved to the new town centre museum in Le Mans Crescent.

In 1969 outdoor scenes for the Bolton-based film Spring and Port Wine, starring James Mason, were filmed in the park.

In December 2009 the park received a £4.286 million grant from the Heritage Lottery Fund and Big Lottery Fund, through their joint "Parks for People" programme.

On 22 March 2020, while playing at the park with her family, 7-year-old Emily Jones was stabbed by a 30-year-old woman unknown to Jones's family. Jones died of her injuries shortly afterwards, and the 30-year-old woman was arrested for murder.

== Gallery ==
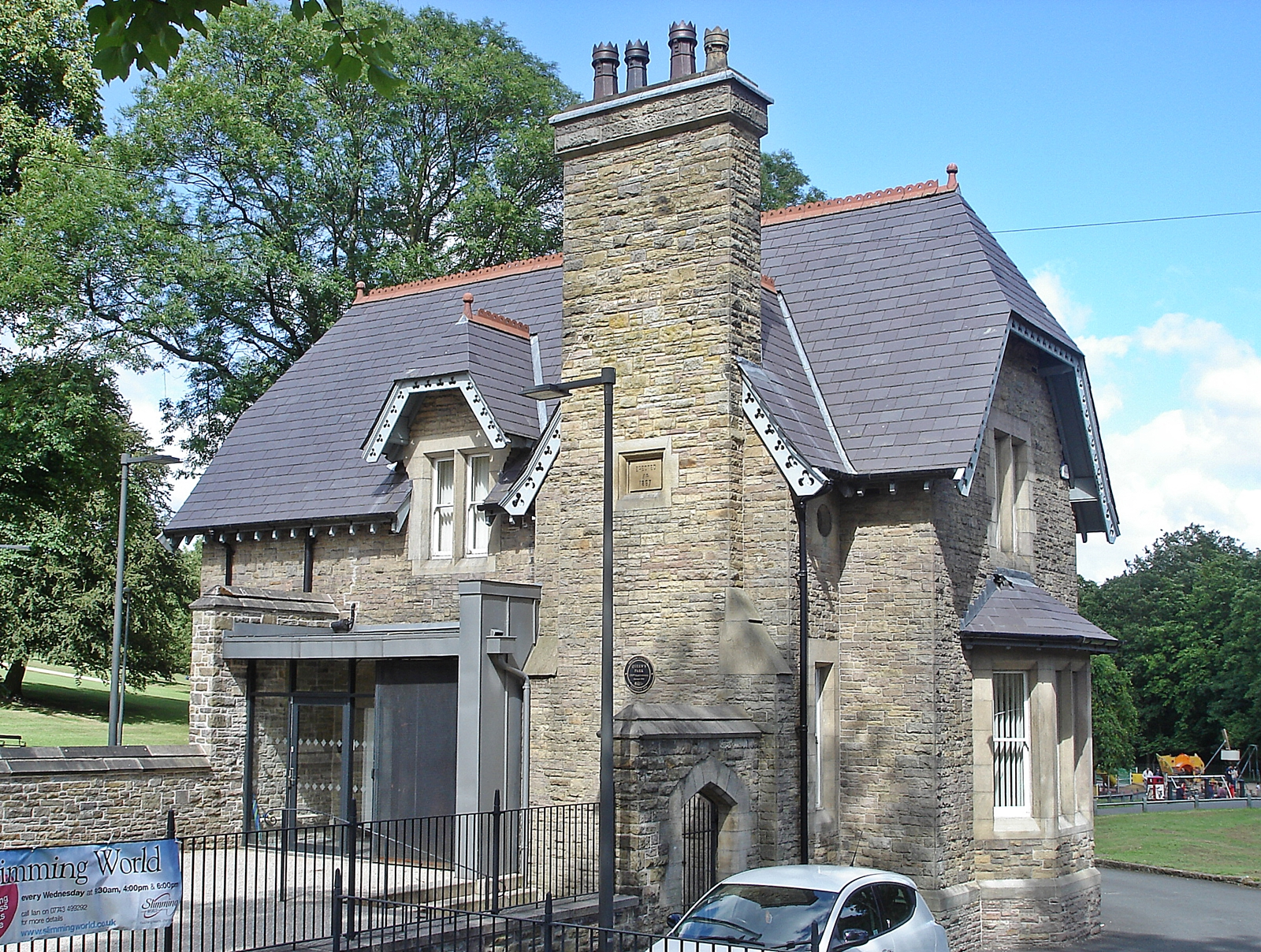
Entrance lodge (now a café)

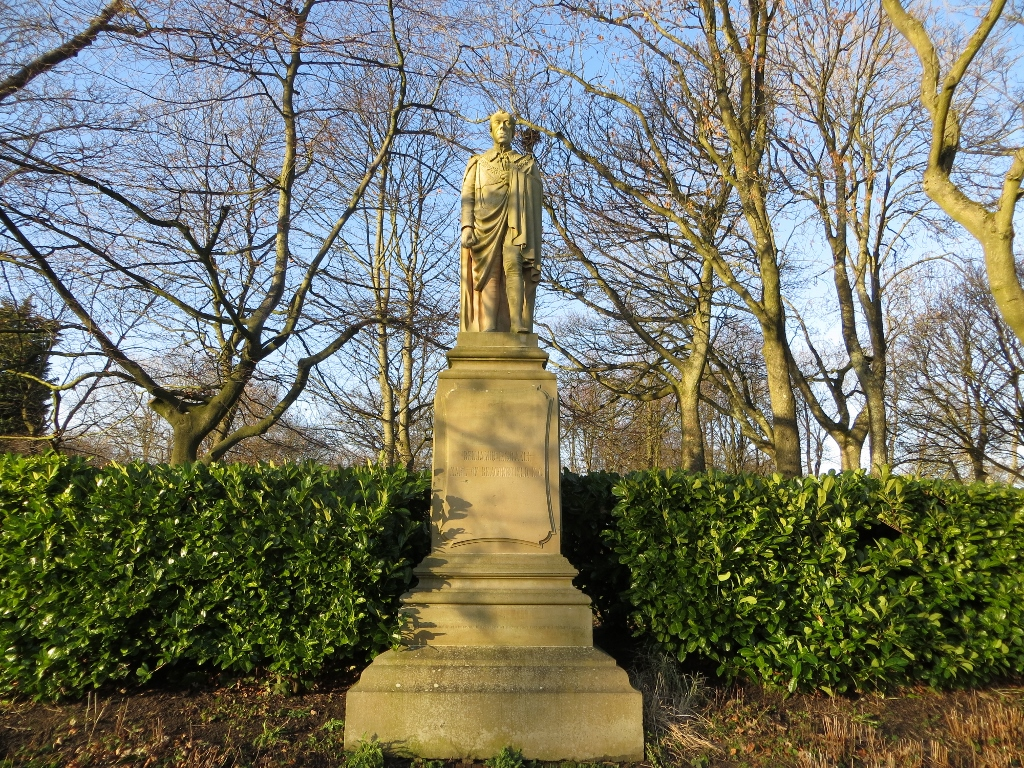
Statue of Benjamin Disraeli

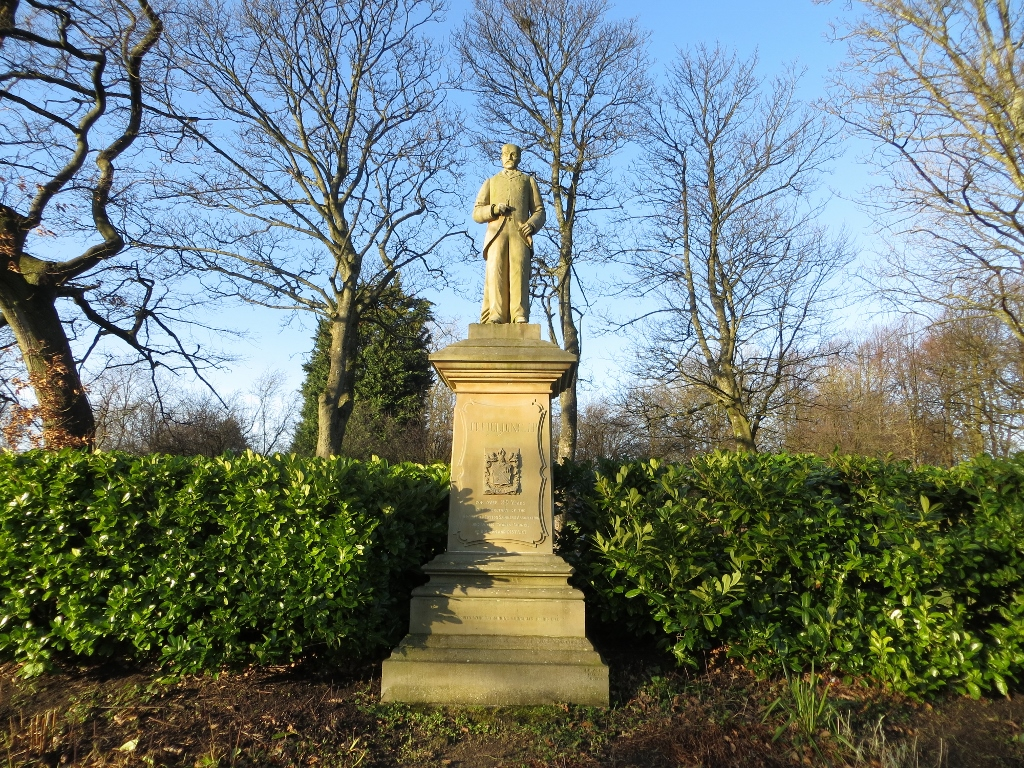
Statue of John Fielding

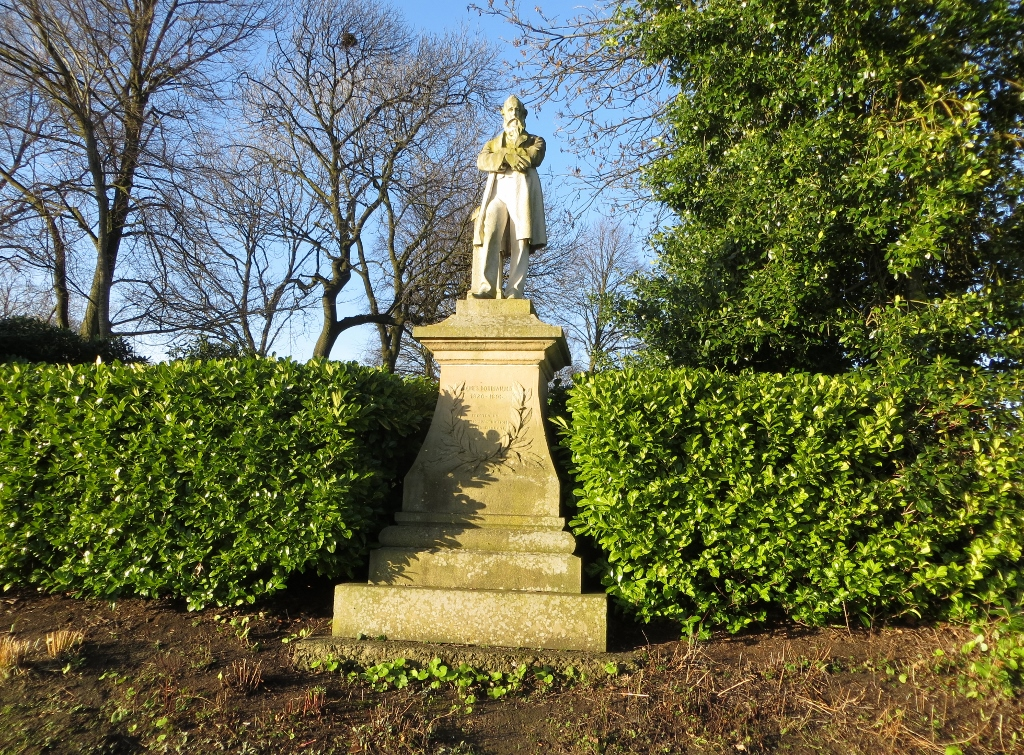
Statue of James Dorrian

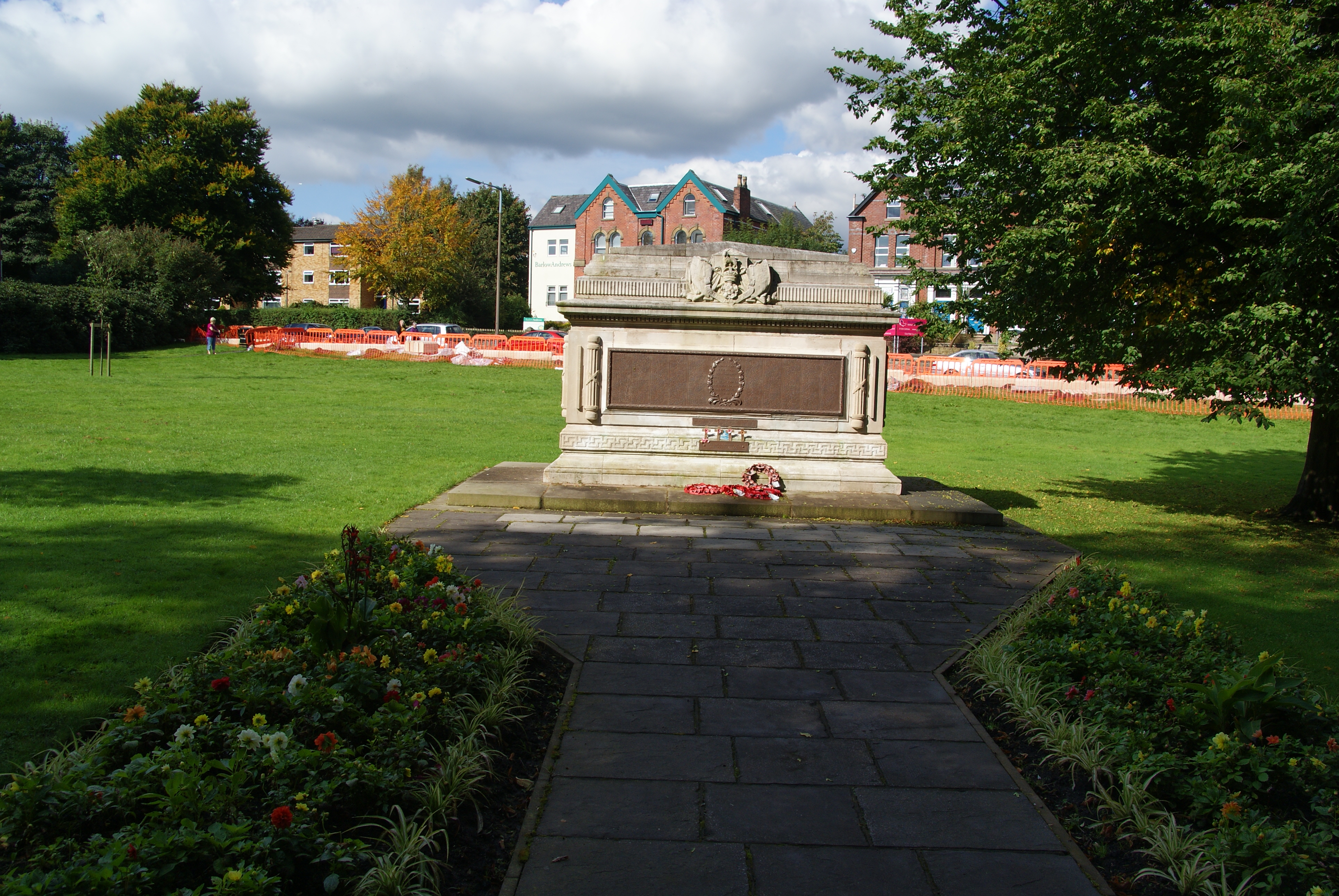
Cenotaph

== Statues ==
The statue of Benjamin Disraeli, twice the Prime Minister of the United Kingdom, was sculpted in Yorkshire stone by Thomas Rawcliffe and was the first to be erected in the park in 1897. Commissioned by the town's Tory majority it was somewhat contentious in that Disraeli had no connection to Bolton, other than paying a visit to Barrow Bridge in 1840, to get material for his novel, Coningsby, in which Barrow Bridge would serve as the basis of Millbank.

The statue of John Fielding was sculpted in stone by local sculptor J. William Bowden and unveiled in 1896 by Lord James of Hereford, the Chancellor of the Duchy of Lancaster. Fielding (1849-1894) was born in Redlam, near Blackburn, the son of a cotton worker and became a millworker himself at the age of 12. In 1874 he succeeded his father as secretary to the Self-Actor Minders' Association and later that year was appointed secretary to the Bolton Trades' Council. He was largely responsible for uniting the two branches of spinning industry unionism into one, the Operative Spinners' Provincial Association, one of the most wealthy and influential trade unions in the country. On his death a memorial fund was established to fund the erection of the statue.

The statue of James Dorrian was sculpted in Portland stone by John Cassidy. James Dorrian (1828-1895) was born in County Down, Ireland and went to work as a doctor in Bolton around 1850. He became very popular amongst the poor and Catholic inhabitants and later served as a Justice of the Peace on the local bench. On his death a subscription list raised the funds for the statue.
