= Killing of Emily Jones =

2020 crime in the United Kingdom

Emily Jones
- Emily Jones, c. 2020
- Born: Emily Grace Jones; 18 January 2013; Bolton, Greater Manchester, England
- Died: 22 March 2020 (aged 7); Salford Royal Hospital, City of Salford, Greater Manchester, England
- Cause of death: Stab wound
- Education: Markland Hill Primary School, Bolton
- Known for: Victim of child killing
- Parent(s): Sarah Barnes and Mark Jones

On 22 March 2020, 7-year-old Emily Grace Jones was stabbed at Queen's Park in Bolton, Greater Manchester, England, while riding her scooter and died shortly afterwards. Eltiona Skana, a 30-year-old Albanian woman unknown to the Jones family, was arrested on the scene and later charged with murder.

Skana pleaded guilty to the lesser included offence of manslaughter on the grounds of diminished responsibility on 6 November 2020. After a trial at Minshull Street Crown Court from 26 November to 4 December, the charge of murder was withdrawn by the prosecution and the jury was directed to formally return a not guilty verdict for murder. On 8 December, she was given a life sentence, with a minimum term of eight years, for the conviction of manslaughter. On 26 January 2021, Skana's minimum sentence was increased to 10 years and eight months, with the presiding judge stating the previous minimum sentence had been "calculated in error".

== Victim ==
Emily Grace Jones was born on 18 January 2013 in Bolton. Her parents are credit manager Mark Jones and solicitor Sarah Barnes. The family were from the Doffcocker area. Jones's parents said, "Emily was seven years old, our only child and the light of our lives. She was always full of joy, love and laughter."

== Killing ==
The Jones family were at Queen's Park in Bolton on 22 March 2020, which was Mother's Day in the United Kingdom. The police coroner's officer Rebecca Gardner described the attack, "Emily was on her scooter playing. As she rode past a wooden bench, a female sitting on the bench suddenly attacked Emily, stabbing her in the neck, causing catastrophic injury. Emily was taken to Salford Royal Hospital, but despite best efforts to save Emily she was pronounced dead at 15:56 that day." Coroner Alan Walsh stated, "In my 20 years as a coroner this is one of the most tragic deaths that I have dealt with."

On the morning of the attack, the perpetrator had bought a pack of three craft knives, one of which she used to kill Jones, from a shop in Bolton town centre. Immediately after the stabbing, Skana attempted to flee the area, but was tackled to the ground by a member of the public and restrained until police arrived.

== Trial ==
A 30-year-old woman who was unknown to the Jones family was arrested on the scene. She was detained under the Mental Health Act and placed in a high-security facility. An inquest into Jones' death was opened on 1 April, and adjourned to 3 July. On 20 May, the suspect was named by the Greater Manchester Police as Eltiona Skana (born 24 February 1990), who is originally from Albania. She married in February 2012 and moved to Kuwait, but returned to Albania in September 2013. She then left Albania again and went to Germany, where her sister arranged for an agent to transport Skana through Italy and France and smuggle her into the United Kingdom on a lorry. Skana claimed asylum upon her arrival in the United Kingdom on 13 August 2014. Her asylum application was initially refused in June 2018, but this decision was overturned following an appeal and she was given a residency permit lasting until November 2020, and leave to remain until 2024. Skana later admitted to lying on her asylum application, by falsely claiming that she was a victim of human trafficking. At the time of her arrest, Skana was unemployed and lived in a flat in Bolton.

Skana was charged with murder along with possession of a bladed article. She was remanded in custody and scheduled to appear at Manchester and Salford Magistrates’ Court on 26 May. She did not enter a plea to the charges at her May court appearance. A plea and trial preparation hearing took place on 5 October. Appearing via a video link from Rampton Secure Hospital, Skana did not speak at the October hearing, and her barrister asked that the arraignment happen at a later date. Presiding judge, Mr Justice Henshaw, adjourned the proceedings until 6 November. At the November hearing, Skana denied the charge of murder, but pled guilty to the lesser included offence of manslaughter on the grounds of diminished responsibility. An adjournment of the hearing for seven days was requested to give the prosecution time to consider the manslaughter plea. Justice Henshaw granted the adjournment, and added that the case would proceed on the basis of a "full-blown trial".

Skana's trial began on 26 November 2020. The court heard that Skana was admitted to a psychiatric hospital in 2015 after threatening her neighbours with a weapon, and was again detained and given further treatment in 2017 when she stabbed her mother in the hand and threatened her sister. Police discovered anti-psychotic medication in Skana's flat after her arrest, which defending barrister Simon Csoka said amounted to "about a month's worth". On the fourth day of the trial, a psychiatric nurse at Rampton Hospital, said Skana had told him, "'I killed someone, that’s the reason why I’m here.' She said, ‘it was premeditated, I waited in the park, I picked my victim and I killed somebody and tried to run away'." Syed Afghan, a consultant forensic psychiatrist, said on the sixth day of the trial that Skana had a history of violence when unmedicated. He stated that, during Skana's detainment at Rampton Hospital, it was mutually agreed to discontinue the anti-psychotic medication, after which hospital staff observed Skana behaving strangely. She was seen "laughing hysterically" after she noticed a girl on television who bore a resemblance to Jones, and in another incident Skana became enraged and was "frothing at the mouth". Afghan resumed the course of anti-psychotic medication on 16 October, and testified in court that there was "ample evidence" that Skana had paranoid schizophrenia.

The prosecution initially argued that Skana should be convicted of murder, noting that she had bought a knife on the morning that she went to the park and killed Jones, and stated that Skana was using her history of mental illness as a "convenient excuse" for the crime. On 4 December 2020, following Dr. Afghan's testimony, prosecution barrister Michael Brady said there was "no longer any realistic prospect of conviction" for murder, and asked the jury to find Skana not guilty of that offence. Trial judge, Mr. Justice Wall, scheduled the sentencing for the conviction of manslaughter for 8 December. On that day, Skana received a life sentence, with a minimum term of eight years before eligibility for release. Prior to sentencing, Mark Jones, father of the victim, said what happened to his daughter is a "public outrage". In a victim impact statement, Jones said, "Emily was a vulnerable child full of innocence and wonder, she was just starting off on her path of life and her future was cut short. Our future has also been taken away. How can we enjoy life when the best part of it has been taken away? ... I cannot understand why this has happened. We want people hearing this statement to understand that this should not have happened. How can an innocent child playing in a park be killed in such a monstrous way?"

== Imprisonment ==
Skana's defence argued during sentencing proceedings that the "public interest aligned" with detention in a psychiatric hospital instead of a prison. Mr Justice Wall ordered Skana to serve her term at Rampton Secure Hospital, and stipulated that Skana should only be released if she no longer poses a risk to the public. He added that, despite her mental illness, Skana had a "significant amount of responsibility" for the crime, which justified a "hybrid" order rather than a hospital order, meaning Skana has the possibility of being transferred from hospital to prison to serve the remainder of her sentence if her condition improves sufficiently. On handing down the sentence, Mr Justice Wall told Skana that "what this means is that you will be detained in hospital until no longer necessary. If or when it's no longer necessary you will be released to prison. Once in prison you will serve the remainder of the sentence that I have imposed." Due to the pre-trial detainment period, 196 days were reduced from Skana's eight-year minimum sentence. In concluding his sentencing remarks, Mr Justice Wall said, "If you are never deemed fit for release you will remain in hospital or prison for the remainder of your life."

On 26 January 2021, Skana's minimum sentence was increased from eight years to 10 years and eight months. Justice Wall stated that he reached the original eight-year minimum term by halving the notional determinate sentence of 16 years, but added that "when I passed that sentence I had forgotten from the 1st April 2020 the law as to the minimum period to be served by a violent or sexual offender whose sentence was or exceeded seven years was two thirds, and not one half of the sentence. It is an error to which all in court fell, for which I take full responsibility." Jones's father Mark welcomed the increase of the sentence, but said he will "keep fighting tooth and nail" to prevent Skana from ever being released, "whether it's ten years or 20 it won't be enough for me." He also stated that Emily's death could have been prevented if the Greater Manchester Mental Health (GMMH) NHS Trust had handled Skana differently.

The GMMH Trust conducted an internal review and concluded that it could not have foreseen the attack. Mark Jones said the internal review was inadequate, "It was pretty disgraceful to be honest because they outlined all these failings, and there were a lot, and at the end of it their finishing line was, ‘we still think the attack on your daughter was unpreventable’, which is ridiculous. I have spoken to the CEO on a number of occasions and I have told him, ‘I am going to do my utmost. You need to admit liability here and apologise to my family.'" NHS England subsequently began an investigation and review of the GMMH Trust.

== Memorial ==
Jones was a pupil at Markland Hill Primary School in Bolton. After her killing, the school announced plans for a memorial garden. The fundraising target of £5,000 was reached within 12 hours, and soon surpassed £11,000. Headteacher Louise Close said: "We want a lasting legacy for this little girl who was taken so soon, so quickly and tragically."

A separate fundraiser started by Jones's parents raised over £10,000 within 24 hours, with the funds going to the Bolton Lads' and Girls' Club, which provides sports and art activities for children and teenagers across Bolton. It reached over £25,000 by the time of the criminal sentencing in December.

== See also ==
- Knife legislation
