= Corporation Park, Blackburn =

Victorian park in Lancashire, England

Corporation Park
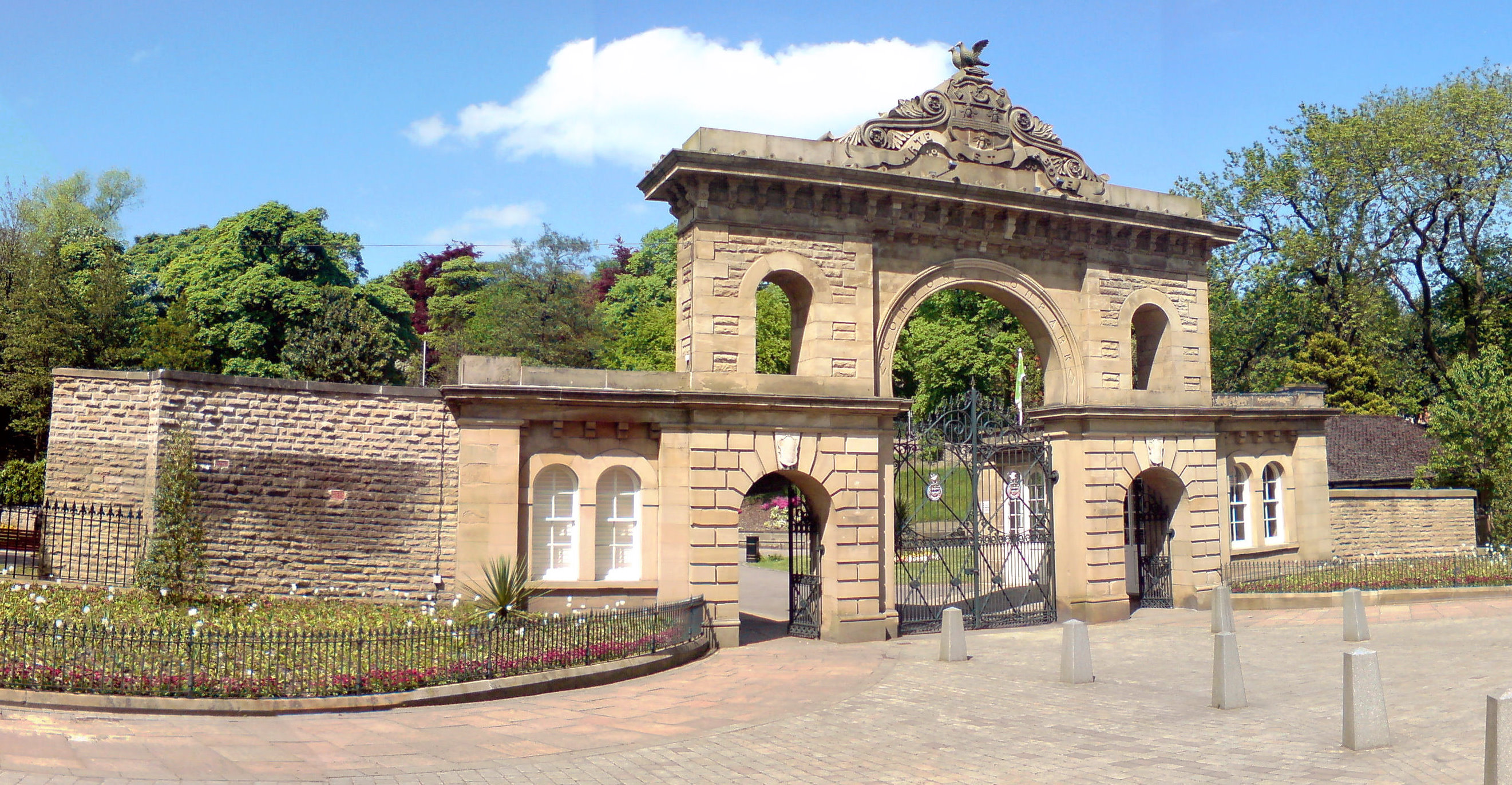
- Triumphal arches at the southern entrance (large version)

- Location within Blackburn
- Interactive map of Corporation Park
- Type: Urban park
- Location: Blackburn, Lancashire, England
- Coordinates: 53.7562°N 2.49536°W
- Area: 44.5 acres (18.0 ha)
- Created: 1857
- Operator: Blackburn with Darwen Council
- Open: All year

Corporation Park is a traditional Victorian park in Blackburn, Lancashire, England. It was landscaped by William Henderson and opened in 1857. Corporation Park is regarded as the main formal park in Blackburn and is used mainly by local people for general recreation, walking and dog walking, as well as for its tennis, bowling and football facilities.

The park is registered by English Heritage as a Park and Garden of Special Historic Interest and is one of around 440 facilities of "exceptional historic interest" meriting a Grade II listing. The park has also been credited with the Civic Trust's prestigious Green Flag Award. Corporation Park also gives its name to a local government ward for Blackburn with Darwen Borough Council.

The 18 hectare (44.5 acre) park occupies a relatively central location to the west of the main town centre precincts. The land is delineated to the north and south by two of Blackburn's main arterial roads. Revidge Road stretches for 490 metres (535 yards) along its northernmost edge; the grand southern entrance at Preston New Road (90 metres, 98 yards) arches away immediately along East and West Park Roads to reach its greatest width of 625 metres (685 yards) from Park Crescent to Brantfell Road. The grounds can be entered from the main southern entrance, two entrances aside the east and west porter's lodges or ten other gates on the perimeter of the park.

== Features ==
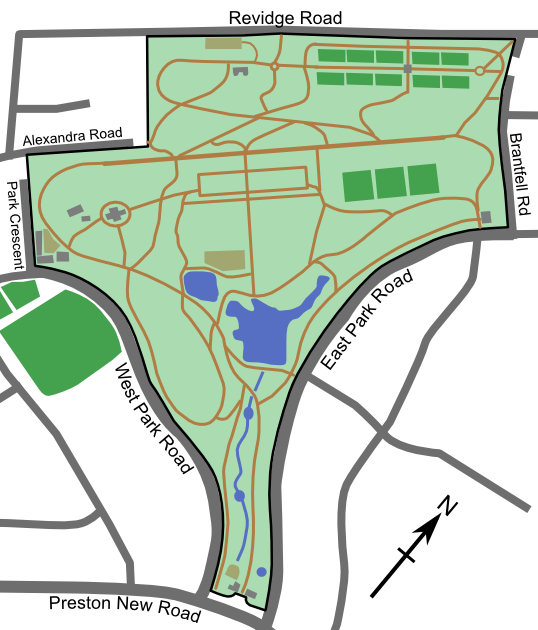
Map of Corporation Park

A Grade II listed triumphal archway with flanking lodges (see picture above) marks the main entrance at the southern edge of the park, from which the landscape widens and rises 84 metres (276 ft) to its peak adjoining Revidge Road in the north. Over one of the smaller side arches reads an inscription: "This park was publicly opened on the 22nd day of October 1857 during the mayorality of WILLIAM PILKINGTON ESQUIRE, by whose munificence the four ornamental fountains were presented to the borough". Travelling through the large archway for carriages or two smaller side arches on foot, visitors are presented with the largest of these recently restored ornamental fountains to the right and a war memorial and formal garden of remembrance (laid out in 1922) on the left. The fountain was formerly powered by gravity, with a water jet rising 23 metres (75 ft) into the air, although the modern jet is more modest. A former reservoir providing drinking water to Blackburn lives on as one of two lakes in the park. The areas of water are home to a number of species of waterfowl, including mute swan, moorhen and ducks. A stream, Snig Brook, flows down the park from the ponds to the memorial garden, broken by waterfalls and pools.

The park is well identified with its conservatory, erected in 1900 and now also a Grade II listed building. A fine example of cast iron Victorian conservatories, the gabled central section is designed to house exotic plants with the cooler wings being used for more northern flora. The building is ornamented with arches, pierced spandrels, columns and features a large clock and a central louvred chimney.

The Council has recognised that the conservatory "is in need of refurbishment" and that "options for this will be realistically addressed during 2008". Although £40,000 of Heritage Lottery Funding was allocated to the upkeep of the conservatory it is estimated that the cost to refurbish the building would be in the region of £1.5m. The conservatory sits alongside an inhabited aviary, which is also proximate to one of two porter's lodges at the West Park Road and East Park Road entrances. A magnificent wide avenue, the broad walk, is flanked by lime trees going east to west.

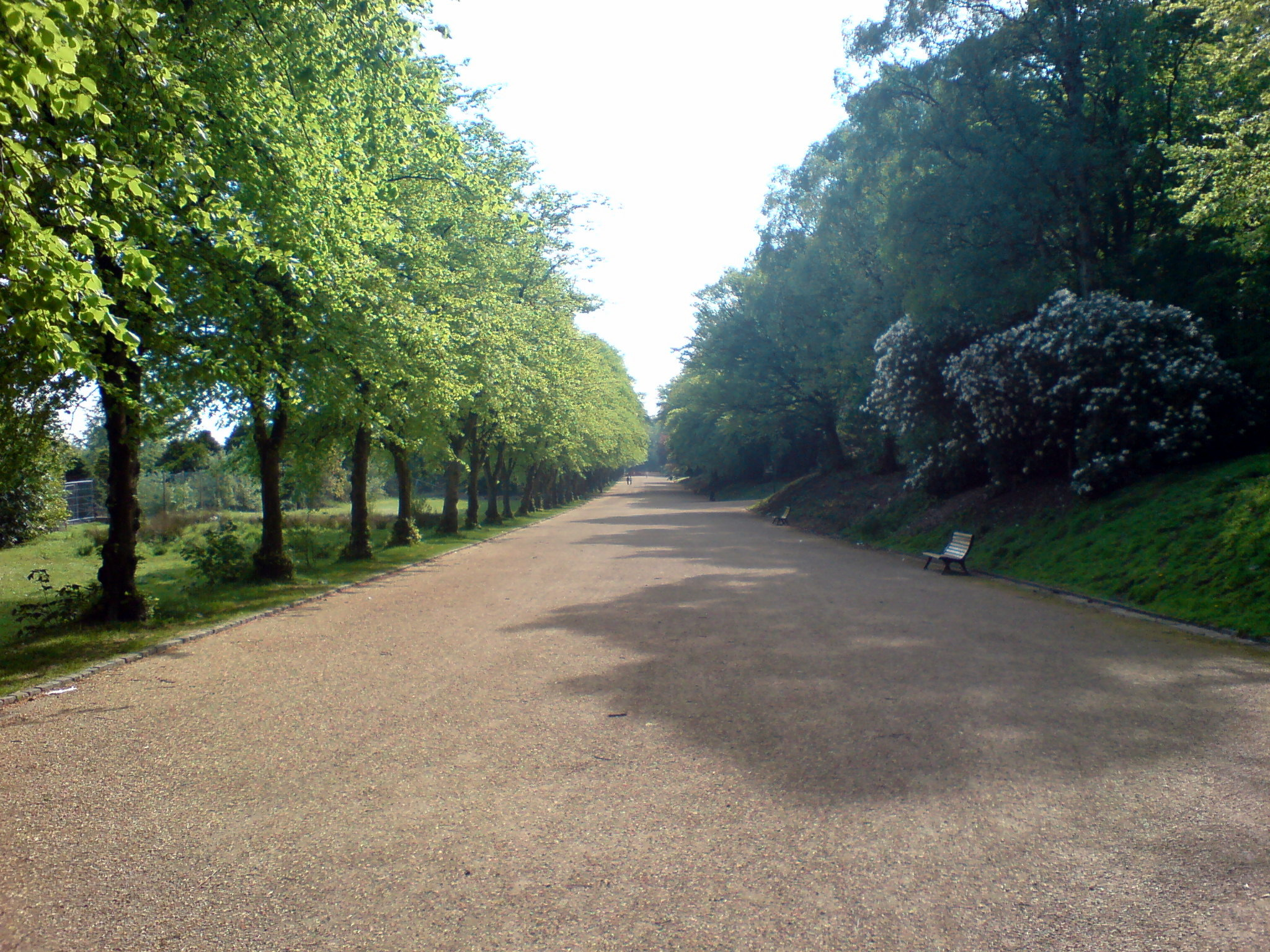
The broadwalk is flanked by lime trees and runs over 500 metres (1,640 ft) from east to west.

The park is also home to a number of sporting facilities. The 'Red Rake' tennis courts are terraced into the hillside in the northerly sections of the park. A set of bowling greens are situated on the southern side of the broadwalk. A Multi-Use Games Area (MUGA) suitable for football and basketball was installed opposite Queen Elizabeth's Grammar School in 2007. A children's play area resides next to the two lakes.

A battlement viewing platform stands 213.5 m above sea level and 83.5 metres (274 ft) above the southern entrance, allowing long views over Blackburn and the West Pennine Moors. This stone barrage formerly hosted two trophy Russian cannons (see history section below) and was developed in 2006 into a panopticon viewing platform as part of a regional arts project. and the park is for the community

== History ==
=== Prehistory as a quarry and water supply ===
The park area contains large reserves of Millstone Grit and was previously a quarry called Park Delph. An ideal building material, the millstone grit was used for building the majority of the cotton mills and churches in Blackburn. One of the park's two lakes was created in 1772 as the town's water supply, Pemberton Clough. A system of wooden piping carried the water to the town until the installation of the mains water in 1847. The smaller lake was known as 'the can' as citizens drew water from it using cans. The reservoir was consequently named 'big can'. Both are on the County Sites and Monuments Record for Lancashire.

=== Preparation and opening ===
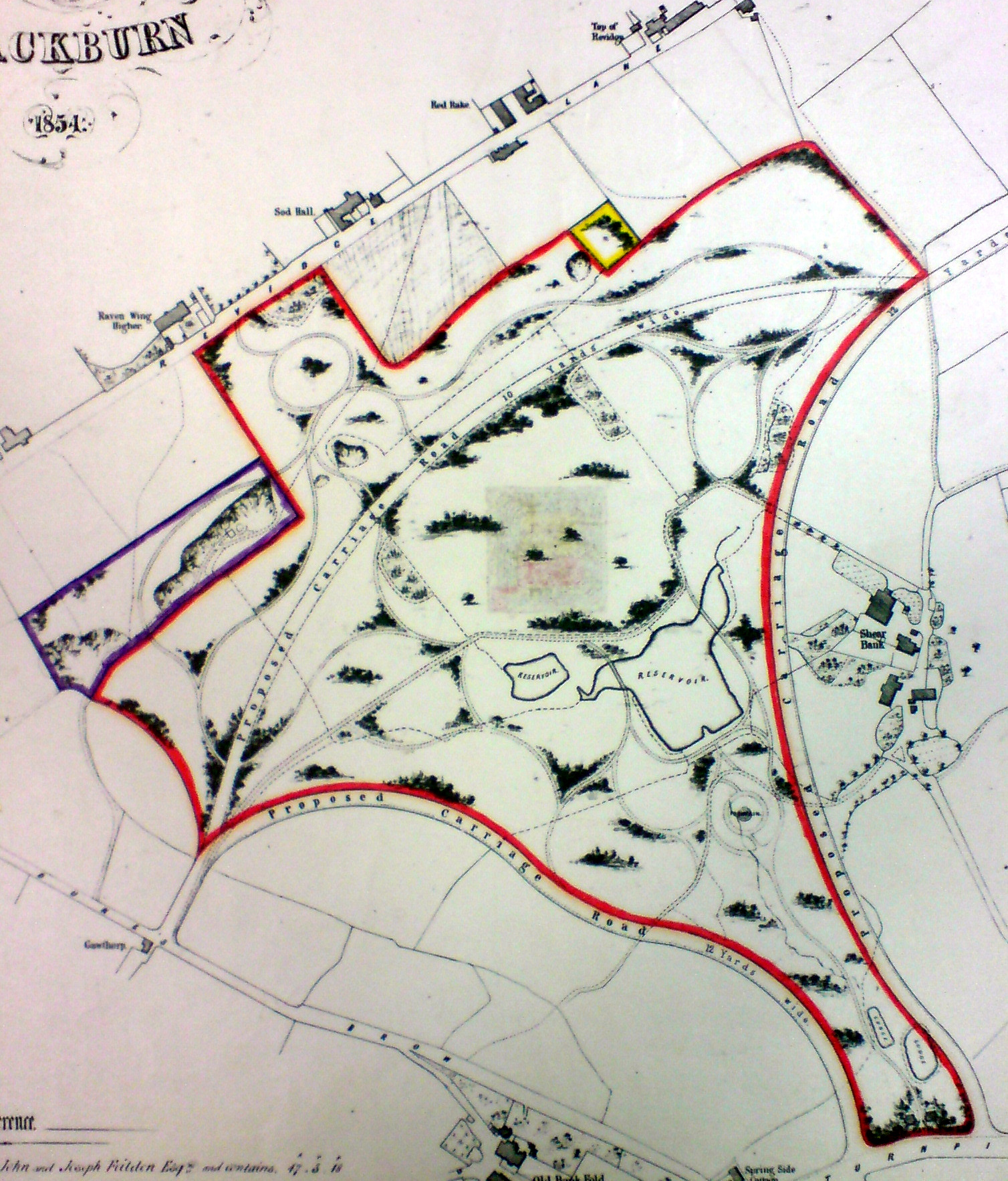
These plans show the park as envisaged three years before its opening in 1857. The location of the fountain and the presence of a carriage road across the park (the Broadwalk was not built until the 1860s) are notable differences from the eventual outcome.

The first steps toward the establishment of the park were taken in 1845 when a sum of £4701 19s 7d was raised towards the purchase and implementation of the park by the sale of land on the town's moor. The 50 acres (200,000 m^{2}) for the park were secured in January 1855 with the purchase by the then Mayor, Thomas Dugdale, for the Corporation, from Joseph Feilden for £3,237 6s 3d. at £65 per acre. Blackburn Corporation was also required to build public roads on the east and west sides of the estate (now East and West Park Roads) at an eventual cost of £4,480 17s 1d. In 1855 work commenced on the Preston New Road entrance by Roberts and Walmsley, awarded the contract to build the arch and lodge at a cost of £789. The East and West lodges were constructed at this time. In 1857 three of the four fountains in the park built and paid for by Mayor William Pilkington, including the largest at the main entrance built by Varley's of Blackburn. The fourth fountain, which stands in the stream running down from the main lake, was built later than the others and was paid for by John Dean. It is made of slate and is of a simpler design than the others. In 1857 two Russian cannons captured from Sevastopol during the Crimean War presented to the town as a Trophy by Lord Panmure, the Secretary of War. These were mounted on a stone-faced battery at the top of the park. By its opening the total cost of the park was £14,701 19s 1d.

The grand opening of the park was performed on 22 October 1857 by Mayor William Pilkington, who led a procession from the town hall. Shops were closed and factory bosses gave their employees leave to attend the event. An estimated 60,000 people were in attendance, 14,000 of whom had arrived by train, leading to overcrowded paths and thousands of people outside the park. The Sevastopol cannon trophies were fired as part of the celebrations. The Blackburn Weekly Times praised the opening of the estate in an editorial following the celebrations:

Our municipal council has done its utmost to place Blackburn at the head of the list of towns known throughout the country for enterprise and public spirit. We congratulate our worthy Mayor and the Town Council on the success of their enterprise to secure for this neighbourhood a public park, which - for economy, position, beauty, and use - may vie with any other park in the land; and we hope that our operatives will to the greatest extent avail themselves of the opportunities thus afforded them for amusement, recreation and health.

The park would soon be host to another massive gathering. When eleven brass bands gathered on the upper terrace of the park in 1861 more than 50,000 people gathered to listen.

==== Cost ====
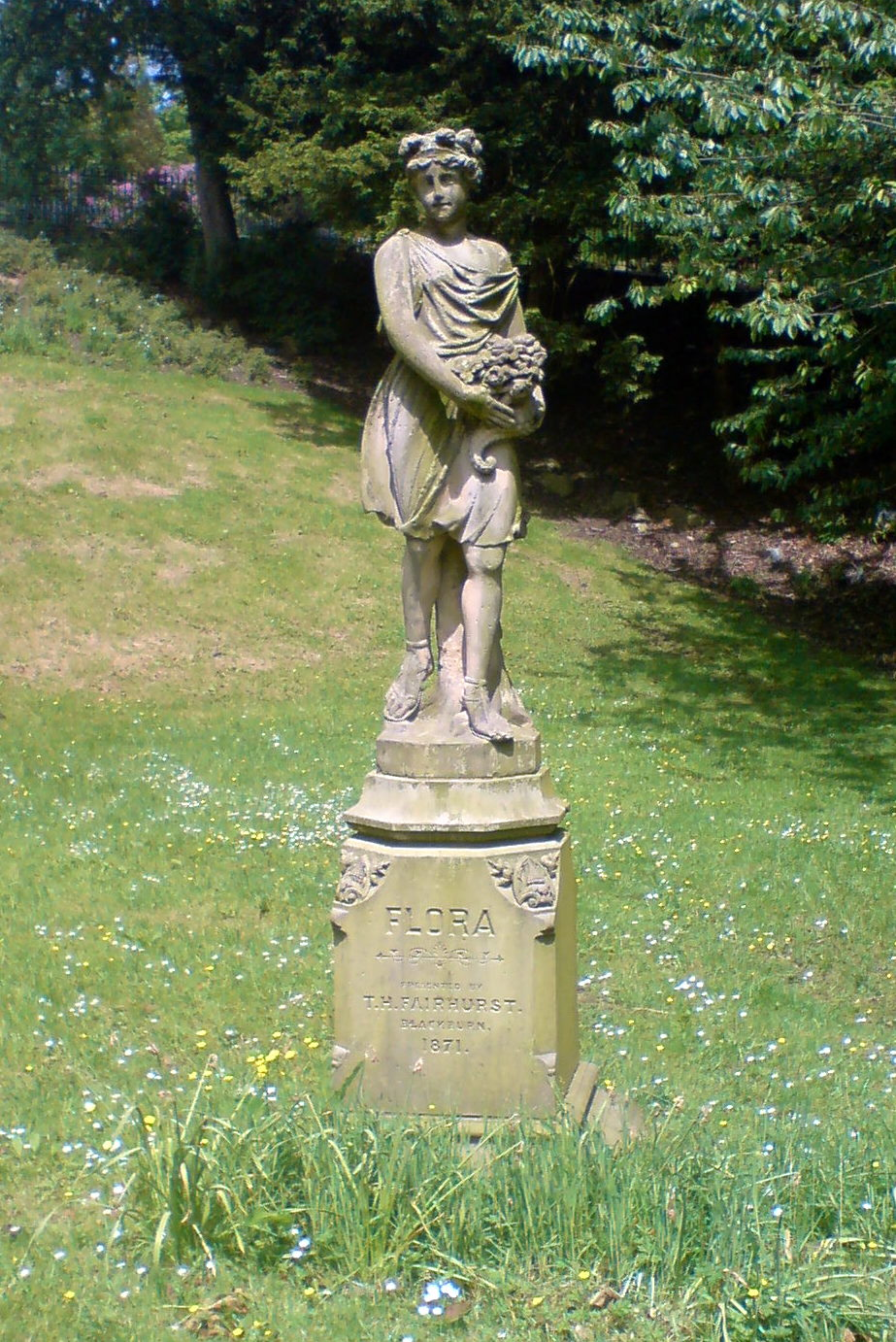
This statue of the Roman goddess Flora was donated by T. M. Fairhurst in 1871.The vandalised leg has now been repaired.

The full cost to the borough as reported in the Blackburn Weekly Times on 24 October 1857 are as follows. All figures are in pounds, shillings and pence.

Aspect	£	s.	d.
Area of the park, full 50 acres (200,000 m^{2}) at £65 per acre	3257	6	3
Interest to 5 July 1856, £172 1s. 1d; compensation to adjoining landowners £77 4s. 11d.	249	6	0
Boundary walls	1583	7	6
Making roads	4480	17	1
Park entrance	831	15	6
Gardeners, masons, flaggers, paviers, manual and team labour	2402	4	2
Inspectors	147	14	0
Surveying	80	8	9
Palisading	727	16	6
Railing and fencing for roads	28	6	3
Materials	143	13	7
Rent and taxes	48	7	3
Legal expenses and stamps	32	8	11
Tools and implements	28	8	1
Conveying water	53	12	9
Joiners' work and plumbing	15	15	10
Manure	72	12	7
Seeds, plants, shrubs, seeds, &e	327	18	2
Landscape gardener and superintendent	116	9	0
Manual and team labour this week, say	39	14	10
Total cost to the day of opening, 22nd Oct. 1857	14701	19	7
Deduct from the above outlay the total proceeds of sale of the recreation grounds on the Town's Moor, viz. :-			
To the East Lancashire Railway Company	951	6	8
Accumulated interest to April, 1856	491	16	9
To the Blackburn Railway Co.	2070	6	8
Accumulated interest to 1 July 1857	1188	9	6
Total to deduct	4701	19	7
Nett [sic] paid for out of borrowed money	10000	0	0

The Times went on to report that "This sum will have to be repaid in 40 years, i.e. one fortieth part in each year, with interest. The average cost, therefore, to the town for that period will be upwards of £500 per annum, or one penny in the pound on the present assessment. This may well be regarded as a triumph of social economy".

=== 19th century ===
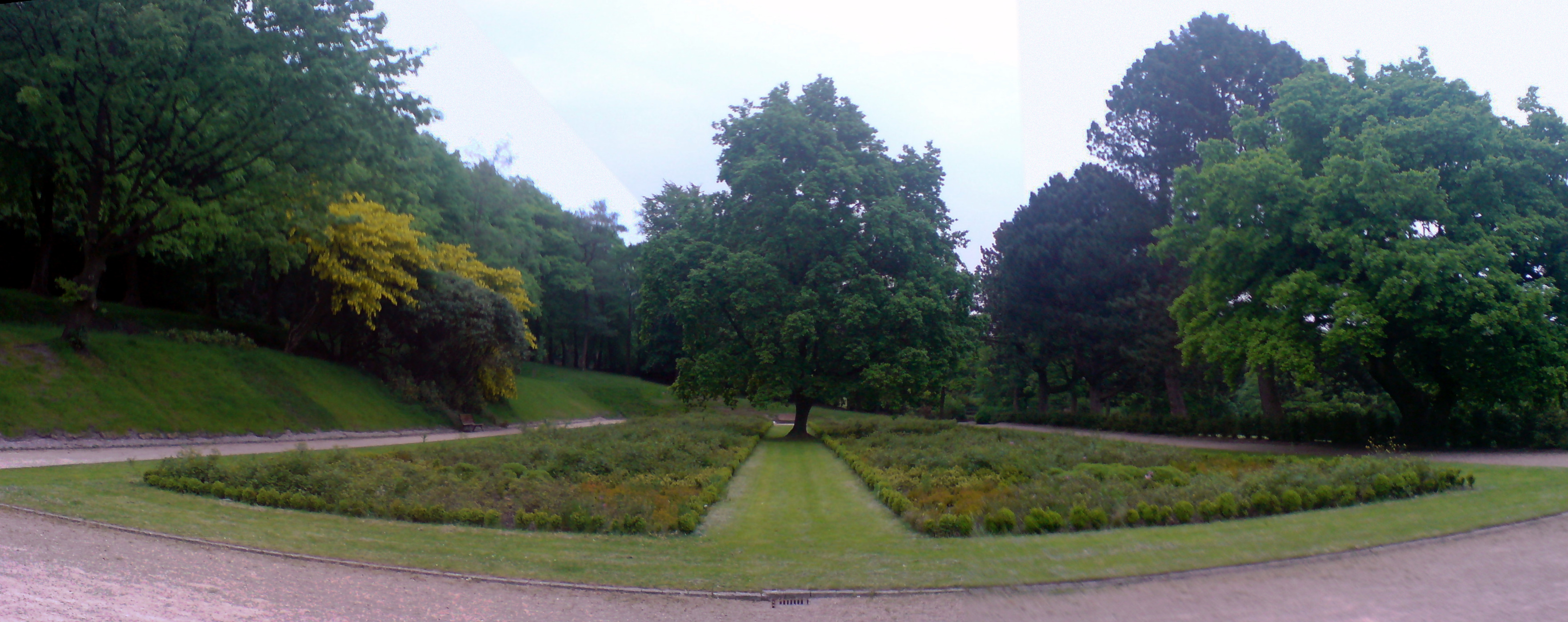
The Italian Gardens were laid out in 1882

The blockade of trade goods, supplies, and arms (including cotton shipments) from the Confederacy by the Union during the American Civil War brought about a severe depression in the region's textile industry known as the Lancashire Cotton Famine. From 1863 to 1864 construction of the Broad Walk, adjoining paths leading to the upper slopes, a carriage drive to the summit and general improvements to the surrounding scarped terrain were undertaken as a public works to provide employment for hundreds of cotton operatives during this depression. The paths were paved with stones from the quarries on the upper slopes.

Over sixty years later in 1936 the Blackburn Times reported that "crowds of young men and maidens would walk four or five abreast, promenading from end to end between 3 o'clock and 4.30". In 1867 the land of the Red Rake Farm on Revidge Road was purchased by the Council with the aim of adding it to the enclosure of the park at some future date. The land cost £1,200, and was intended for sporting use including tennis courts and bowling greens. The park's tennis courts are situated on this land to this day.

The statue of Flora, the Roman Goddess of flowers and spring was presented in 1871 by T. H. Fairhurst. The statue was the work of Thomas Allen of Liverpool who moved to the town in 1870 and created a number of other works in the area, including honeycombed facing stones on the Old Bank in Higher Church Street and the carving on the side of the old YMCA building near Sudell Cross (now the Sir Charles Napier public house). In 1880 the first park bandstand was constructed west of the large lake. This was supplemented two years later with Italian gardens laid out adjacent to the Broad Walk. The statue of Flora inspired horror writer William Hope Hodgson to write his first fiction story "The Goddess of Death".

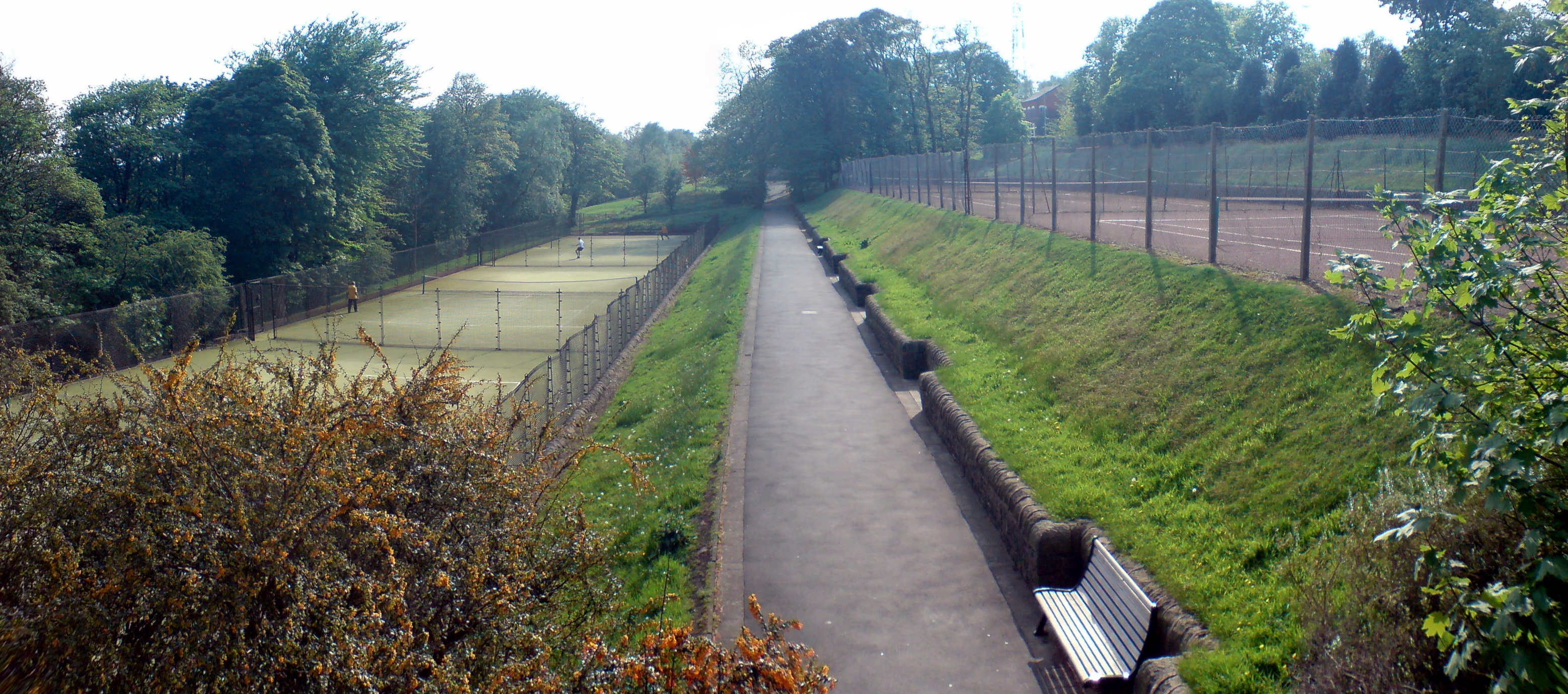
Tennis courts on the land of the former Red Rake Farm are terraced into the hillside.

=== 20th century ===
In 1900 the new conservatory was opened. In 1905 the fountains, which had been in continuous operation since 1857, were turned off. The Northern Daily Telegraph reported a plan to fill the basin of the large fountain with flowers and the others with weeping plants. Although this never happened, the fountains were turned off owing in part to the nuisance caused by the reported drifting of the large fountain's water jet and the £30 annual cost of operating the fountains. The Red Rake site, recently added to the park as a playground was supplemented with new bowling green in 1906 to provide work for unemployed of Blackburn. Money was provided by the Distress Committee, using £307 received from the Queen's Unemployed Fund. In 1908 a gramophone concert held in the park drew an audience of 20,000. The second bandstand was officially opened in 1909.

On a Sunday in February 1914 there was a loud explosion heard across Blackburn, resulting in much interest from the public, many of whom assumed there had been an explosion at Addison Street Gasworks. It transpired the next day that one of the trophy cannons had been fired with about 1½lb of explosive as part of a protest by suffragettes. Users of the park reported seeing a flash and houses around the park were shaken. A large piece of calico cloth was found next to the cannon in a brown paper parcel, on which was written in blue pencil:

Wake up, Blackburn! The Labour party who claim to stand for Justice and Freedom Support a government that Tortures Women under the Infamous Cat and Mouse Act.

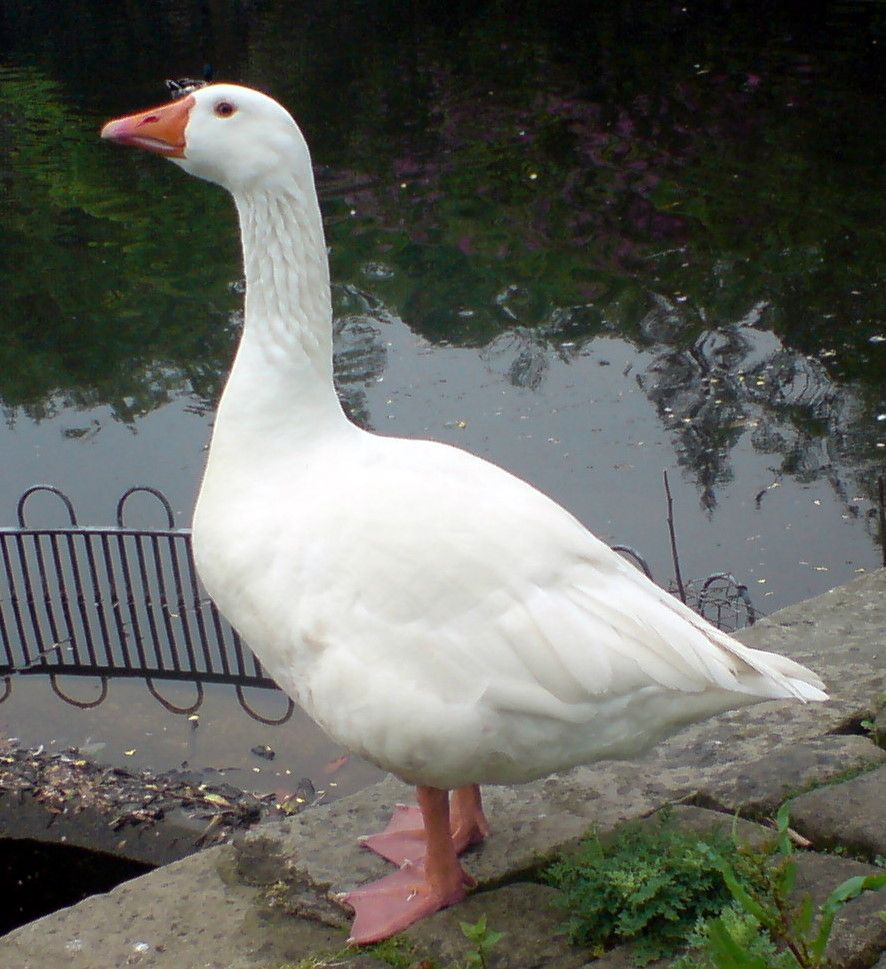
Wildlife in the park includes rabbits, ducks, swans and this domestic greylag goose.

The firing of the cannon required the removal of several years of stones and gravel from the cannon. It was also supposed that the device was not cleaned before it was fired, resulting in the surrounding area being splashed with a yellow substance.

In 1921, it is reported that the park is to have more sports facilities, including four tennis courts and bowling greens to be laid below the eastern end of the broad walk. A new pavilion, The Bowls House, would serve these facilities. Plans for the War Memorial and Garden of Remembrance were approved on 5 October 1922, which laid the improvements out at the southern entrance to the park. A total of three bowling greens are laid between 1923 and 1925 below the eastern end of the broadwalk. A putting green is opened in 1925. The land near Revidge that the Corporation had purchased from the Red Rake Farm was converted into ten hard tennis courts and ornamental gardens in 1924. Again, the work was carried out by the unemployed as part of a £17,000 scheme which included widening the Revidge Road.

In 1937, it was recommended by the Parks Committee that the four German field guns installed in the park after World War I be sold for scrap the Russian cannons were to be kept for the time being. In 1938 it was announced that the Russian guns to be re-conditioned and have their oak carriages replaced by concrete. Plans for new toilets at the southern entrance to the park were approved on 22 February 1939. With the outbreak of World War II, the bandstand, gates and railings were dismantled in 1941 for salvage towards the war effort.

In 1950, a timber aviary was constructed close to the conservatory. Coronation of Queen Elizabeth II in 1953 was commemorated by the planting of two oaks in the middle of the Italian gardens, one on each side of the central path leading up to the Broadwalk. The statue of Flora has been subject to three serious acts of vandalism since 1951. On the centenary of Blackburn's incorporation as a borough the work was daubed with red paint and given a blue sash which read "Centenary Queen 1851-1951". In October 1952 the bun at the back of Flora's head was broken off and a chip from the shoulder section when the statue was knocked of its pedestal. On the night of 21 January 1960 the statue was again attacked with paint in a protest against apartheid in South Africa. A strip of hardboard was hung round the neck reading "1960 Africa Year - Boycot [sic] S.A. goods" It was reported a crowd of unknown teenagers "invaded" the park in 1957 to dance to rock 'n' roll records played on a portable gramophone. In the same year, three weeks are taken to resurface the main drive from the Preston New Road to West Park Road entrances. A new aviary was opened in 1958, replacing the existing timber one with a more permanent structure. Fund were provided by a well-known local ornithologist from Beardwood.

The park was supplemented in the 1960s with a children's play area and paddling pool. In 1974 Corporation Park and adjacent residential areas were designated a conservation area. In 1996 this conservation area was extended to the south and Corporation Park was given a Grade II listing by English Heritage on the register of Parks and Gardens.

=== Restoration programme ===
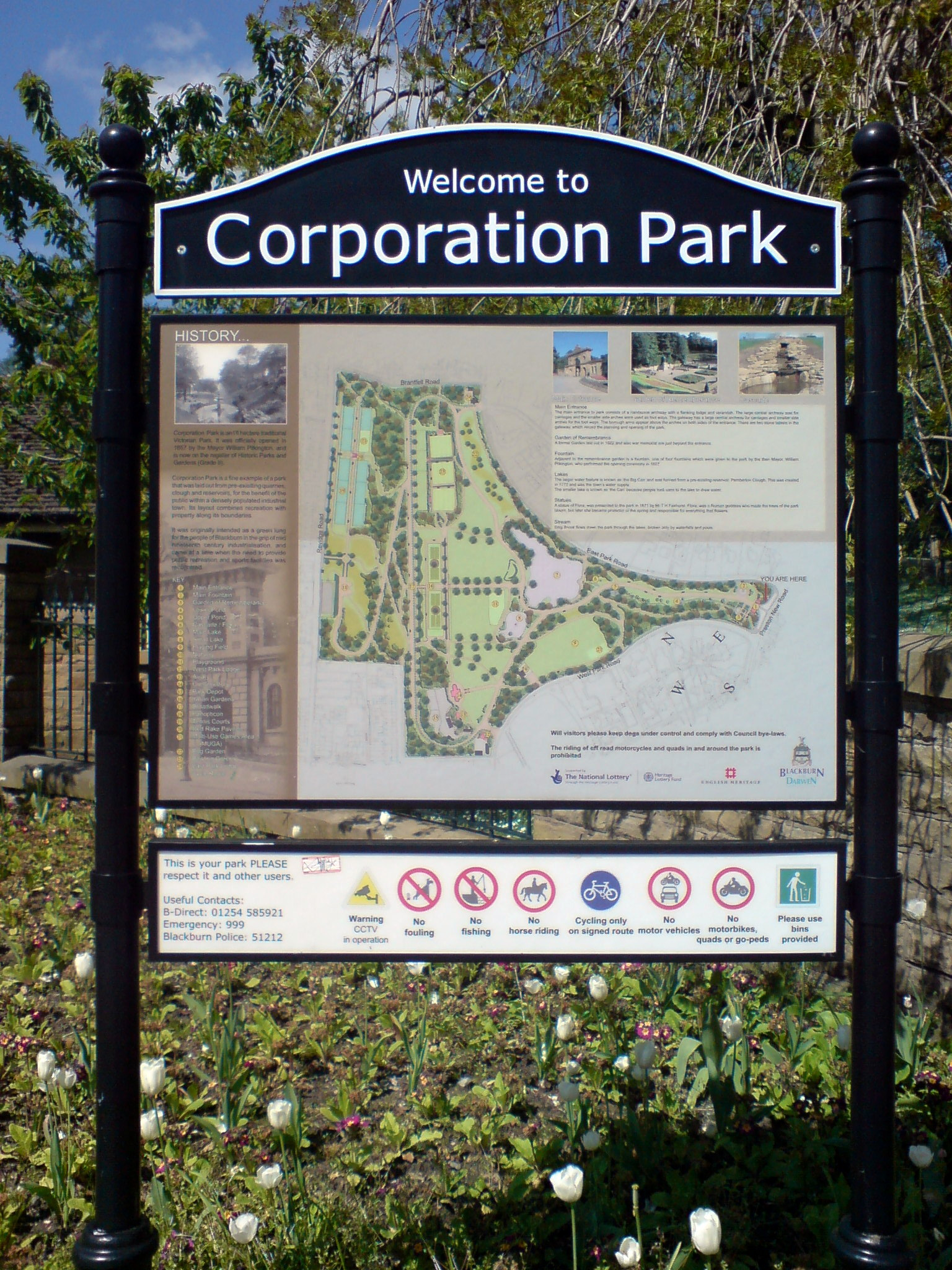
New signage was one of the improvements made in the restoration programme.

A 'Historical Restoration Management Plan' was submitted to the Heritage Lottery Fund in 1999, culminating in many of the improvements on display today. Improvements introduced through the £3.8m landscaping and restoration project include restoration of boundary walls, new gates and the reintroduction of 75% metal railings to the park borders, which were originally removed as strategically valuable metal during World War II.

Other refurbishments include new benches, realignment of coping stones, resurfacing of pathways with tarmac and gravel for the broad walk and Italian gardens. All water features have been cleaned and restored. The pools have been cleared and some de-silt work to the lakes has been carried out. Lake edges have been restored and a new cascade for the main lake dam have been created. Several new planting schemes around the park have been undertaken, including for the Italian Gardens. The restored southern gatehouse and veranda now provides an office at the main entrance for the Park manager and Park Warden. The restoration was performed by Casey's contractors under the management of Capita.

As discussed above, the 'Colourfields' viewing point was officially launched in 2006 and is the first in a series of landmarks called 'Panopticons' - a project of the East Lancashire Environmental Arts Network. The project redeveloped the existing historical cannon positions.

== Gallery ==
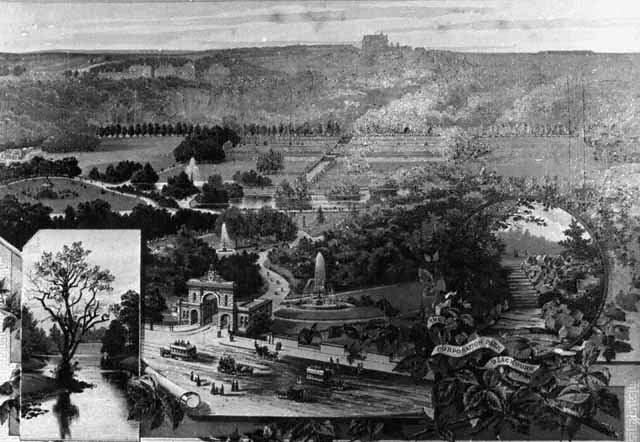
Black and white copy of a colour lithograph

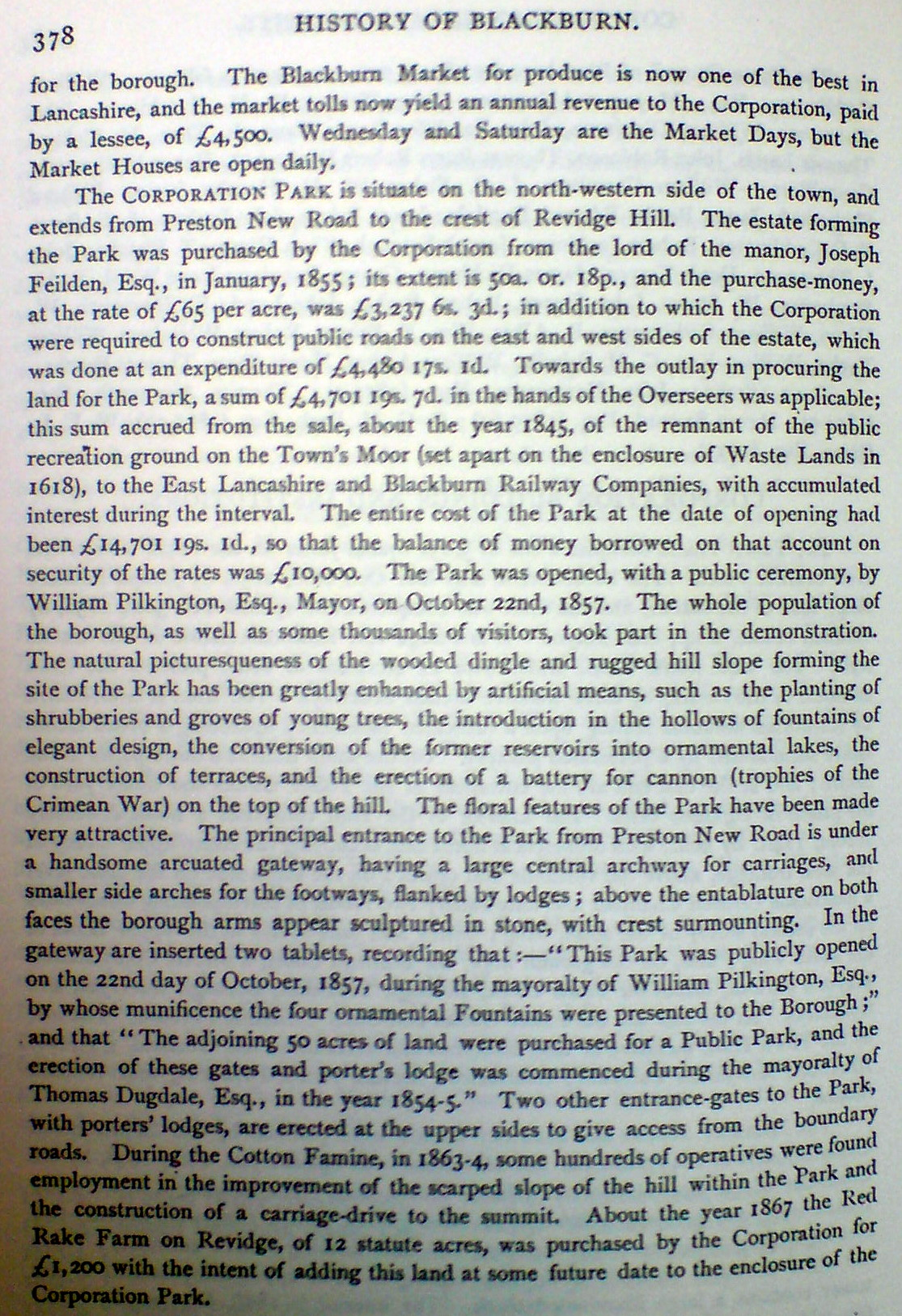
Entry for the park in an 1877 history of the town

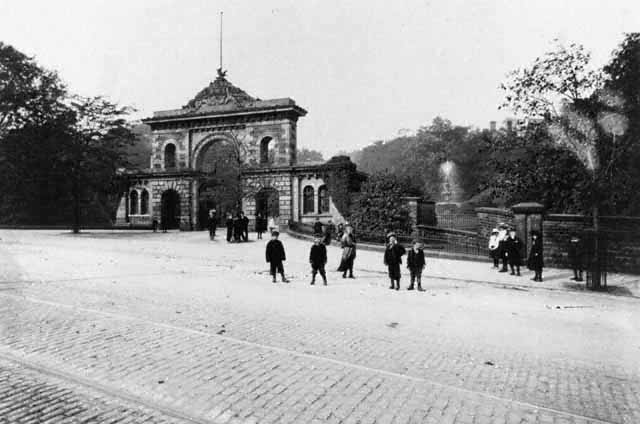
Young boys stand outside the arches on a cobbled Preston New Road

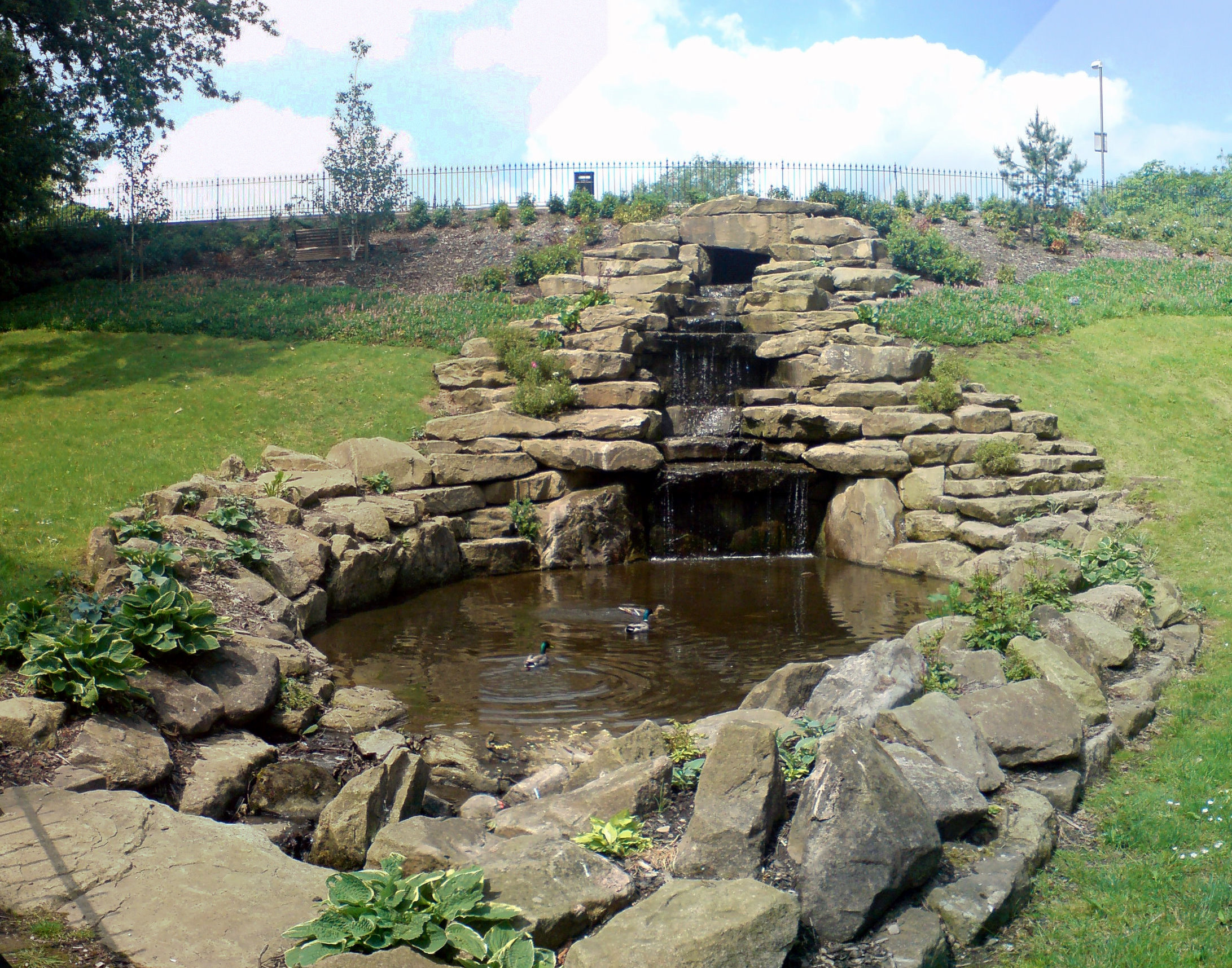
The restored cascade from the main lake

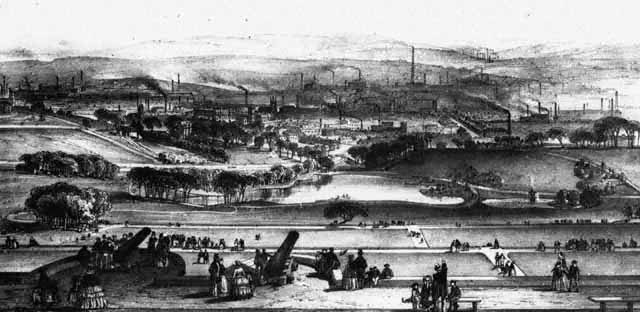
An artist's impression of the view from the cannon trophies

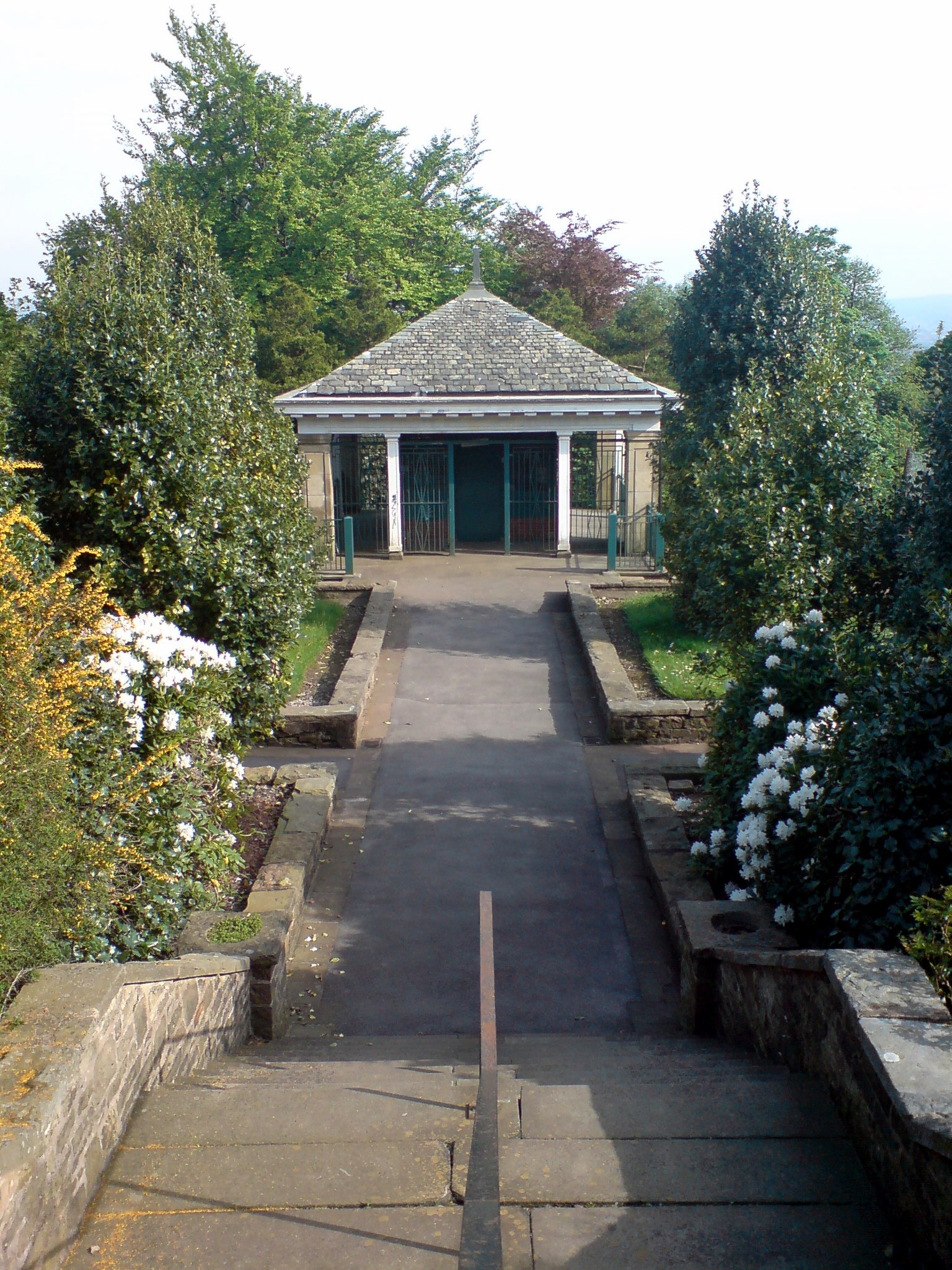
The tennis warden's building

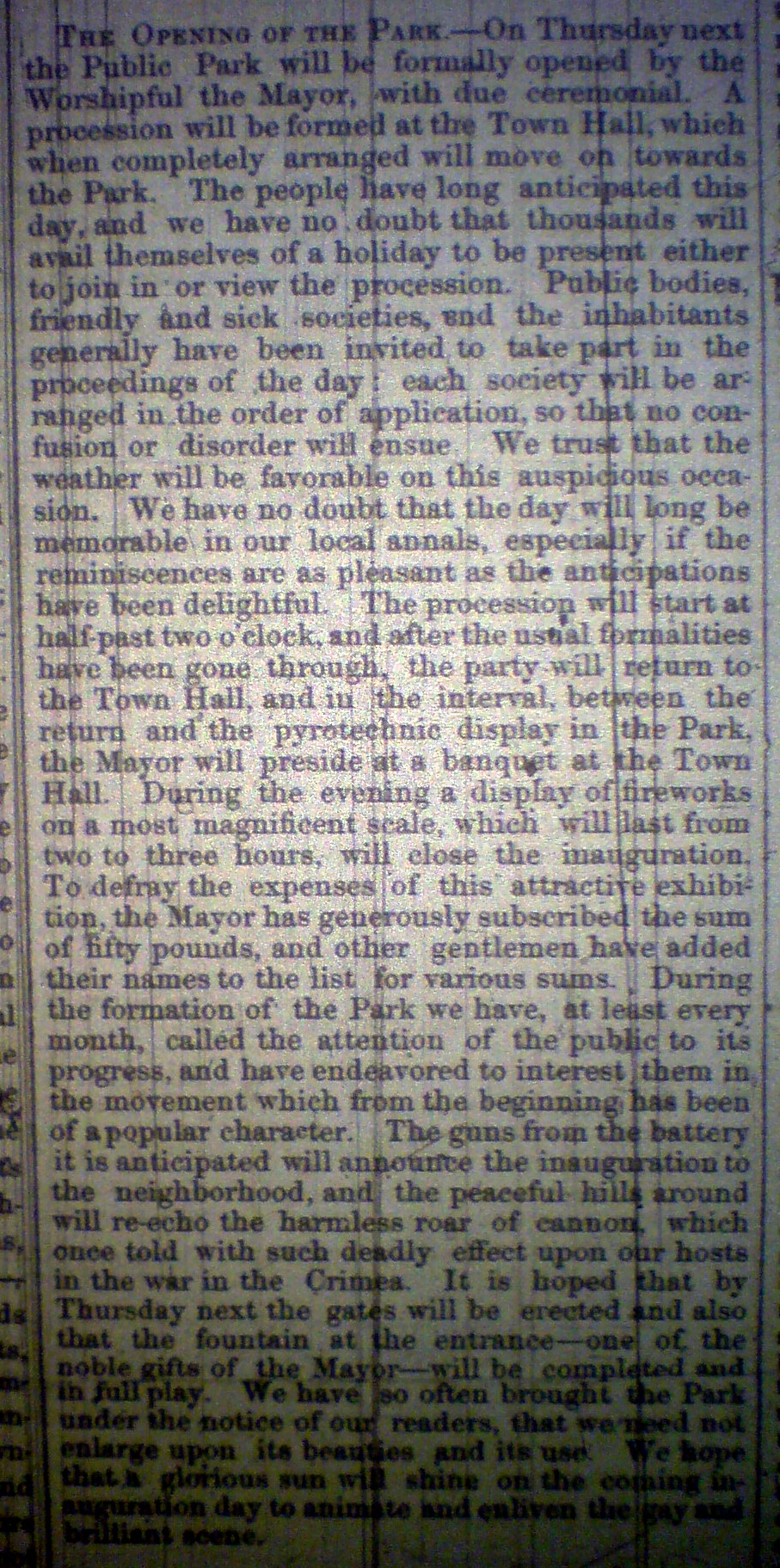
Article from Blackburn Weekly Times previewing the park's opening

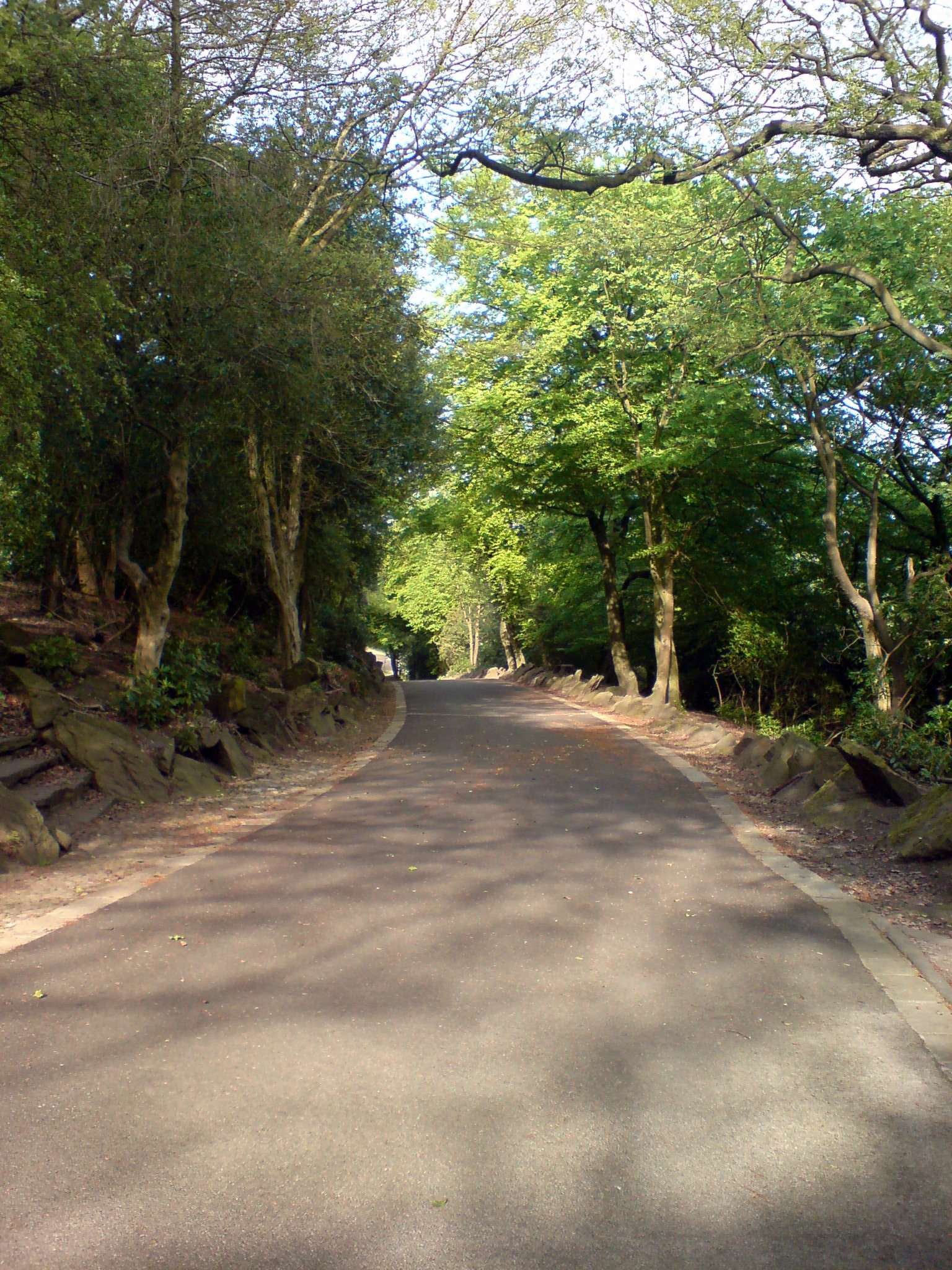
A pathway on the upper slope

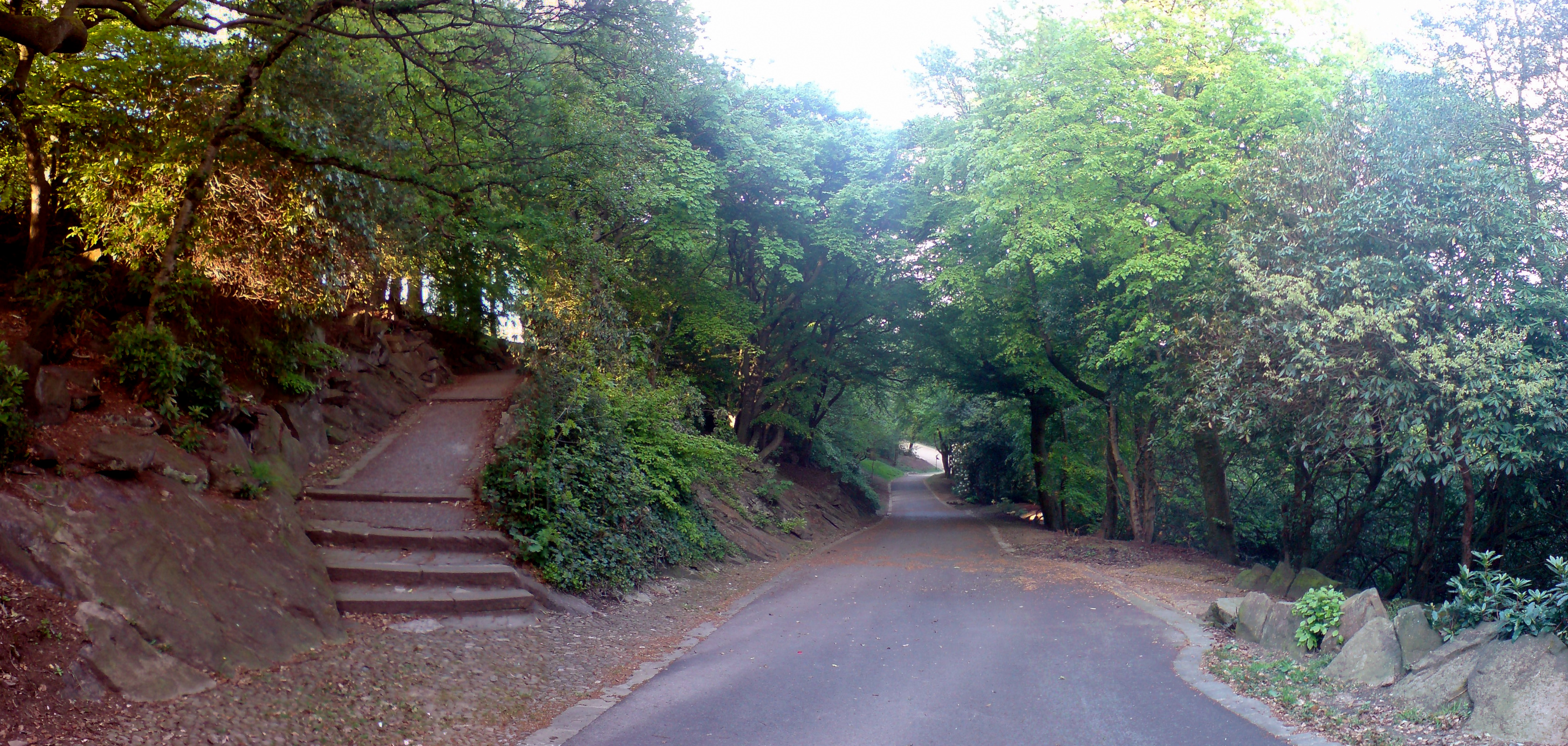
Panoramic view of the convergence of several pathways

== See also ==
- Listed buildings in Blackburn
