= Here I Am (Mackennal) =

Bronze statue

- 'Eton Boy'
- Artist: Sir Edgar Bertram Mackennal
- Year: 1923
- Medium: Bronze figure
- Subject: unnamed youth
- Dimensions: 187.6 cm × 80.8 cm × 123.3 cm (73.9 in × 31.8 in × 48.5 in)
- Condition: Good
- Location: National Gallery of Victoria, Melbourne, Victoria, Australia
- Owner: National Gallery of Victoria
- Commissioner: Earl of Cavan on behalf of Eton College
- Accession: NGV: 2006.216
- Website: ngv.vic.gov.au

Here I Am, sometimes known as the Eton Boy, is a life-size bronze figure by Sir Edgar Bertram Mackennal. It was commissioned in 1923 to form part of the First World War memorial at Eton College, and erected in a colonnade on the playing fields at the instigation of the Earl of Cavan. The statue was later moved to School Hall, and sold by Eton College in the 1960s.

After being held in a private collection, the figure was acquired in 2006 by the National Gallery of Victoria in Melbourne, Australia and forms part of their permanent collection.

== Overview ==
By the 1920s, Mackennal was a leading sculptor, with many public and royal commissions, including an equestrian statue of Edward VII at Waterloo Place in London, and the Edward VII Memorial at St George's Chapel, Windsor.

This work depicts a naked youth, standing with right foot advanced as though walking forward, with both arms stretched out in front, as if figuratively answering his nation's call to arms. It stands 187.6 cm (73.9 in) high and is signed "B.Mackennal". The statue was exhibited at the Royal Academy summer exhibition in 1923.

The title is taken from the First Book of Samuel, chapter three, verses 4-10, in which Samuel's response to the voice of God in the Temple was "Here I am. Take me."

The work derives from Mackennal's bronze statue of Circe made in 1892, who is depicted as a nude with both arms stretched out. Mackennal included similar figures with outstretched arms in his statues of Apollo Driving the Horses of the Sun for Australia House, and the Canadian Red Cross war memorial at Cliveden. The pose may ultimately derive from classical statutes, perhaps the ancient Berlin Adorant.

The statue was sold at Sotheby's in 1984 for £51,700, and sold again at Christie's in 1993 for £34,500, and acquired by an Australian art dealer. The National Gallery of Victoria acquired the figure in 2006.

== Mackennal's influences for this work ==
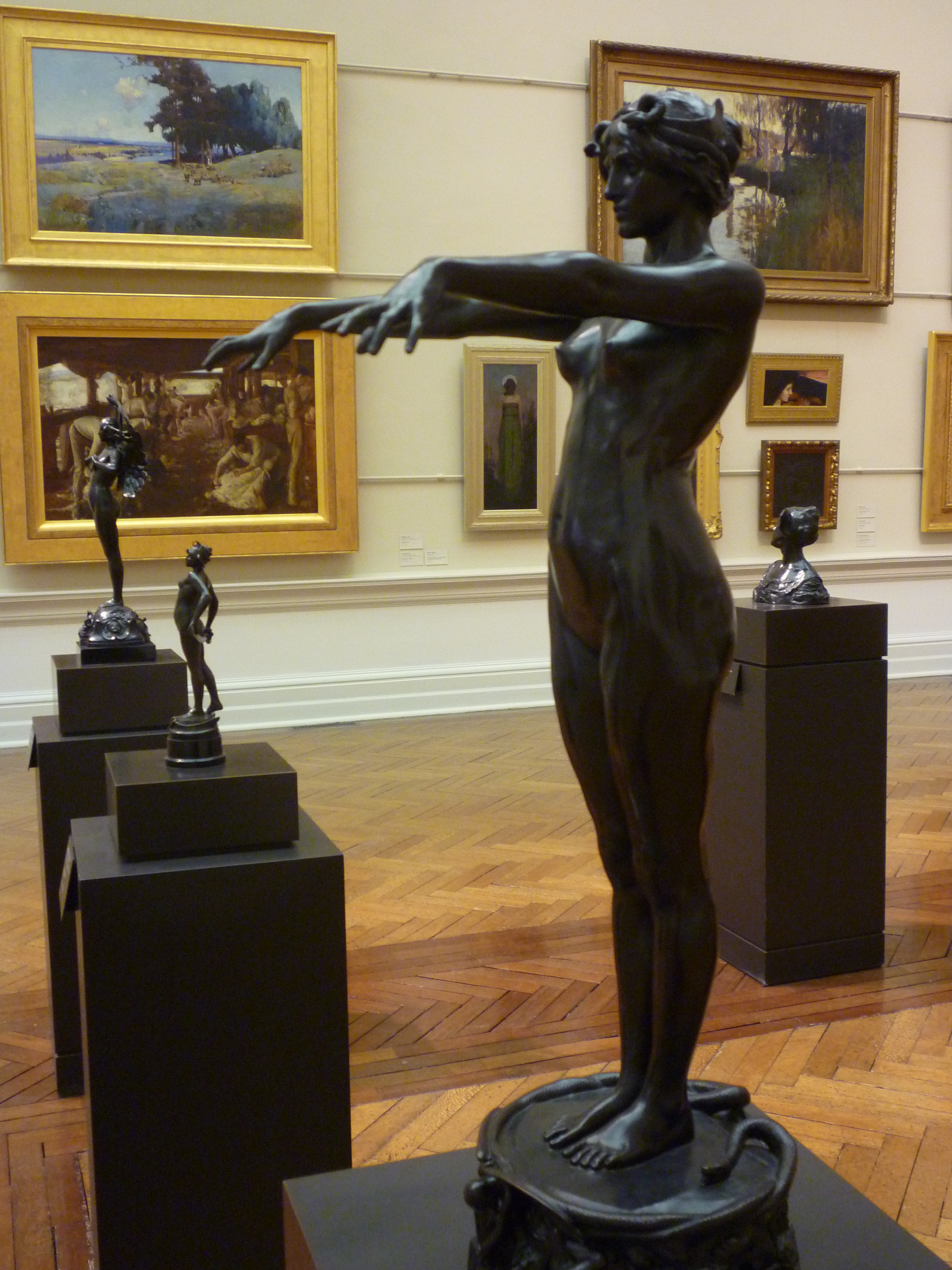
Statue of Circe, 1892

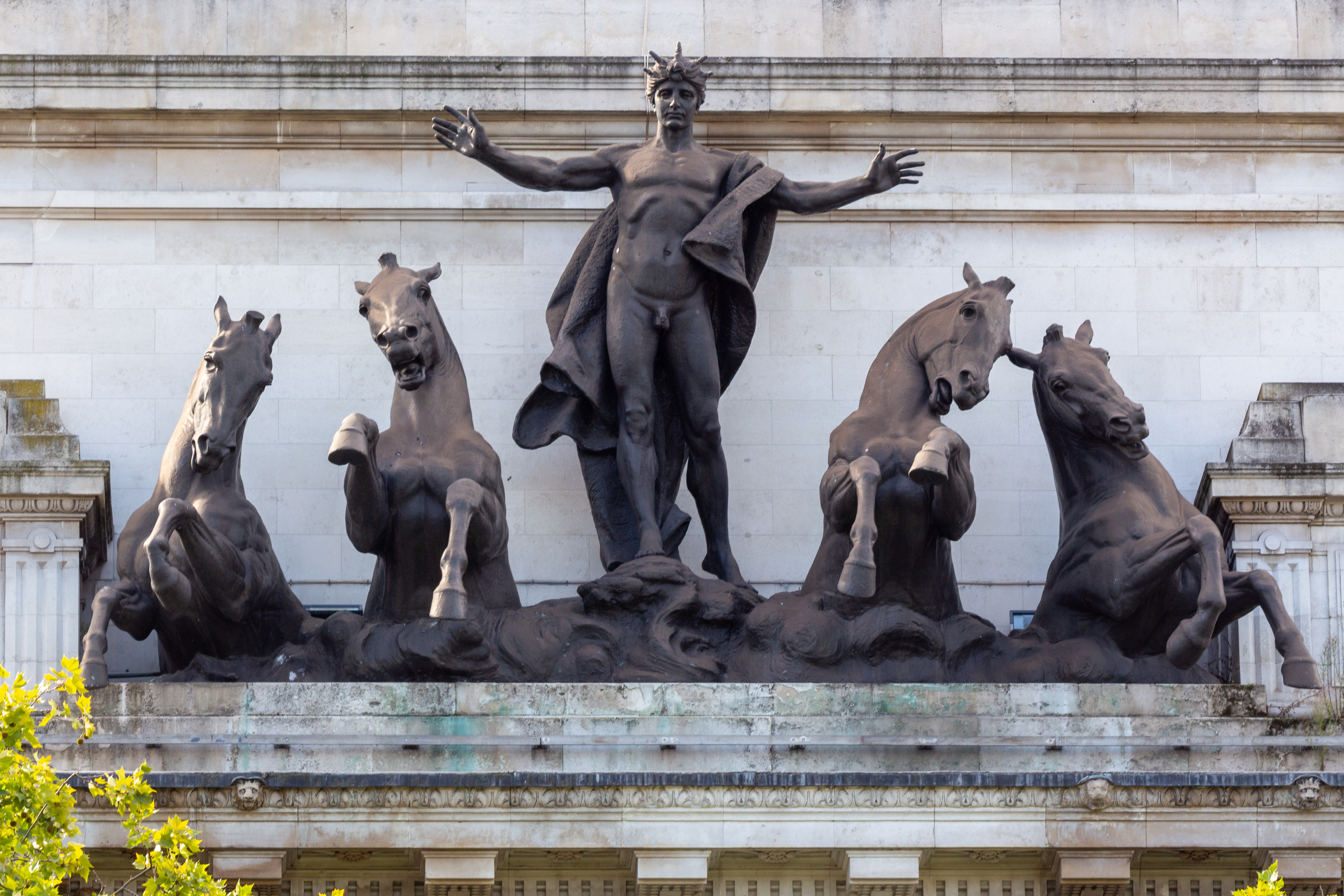
Pediment sculpture of Phoebus and others, 1923

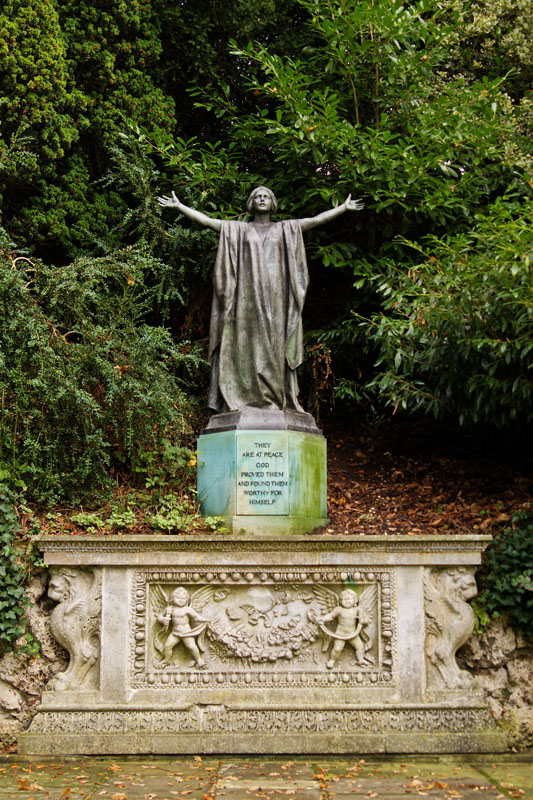
Statue at Cliveden House, c. 1922

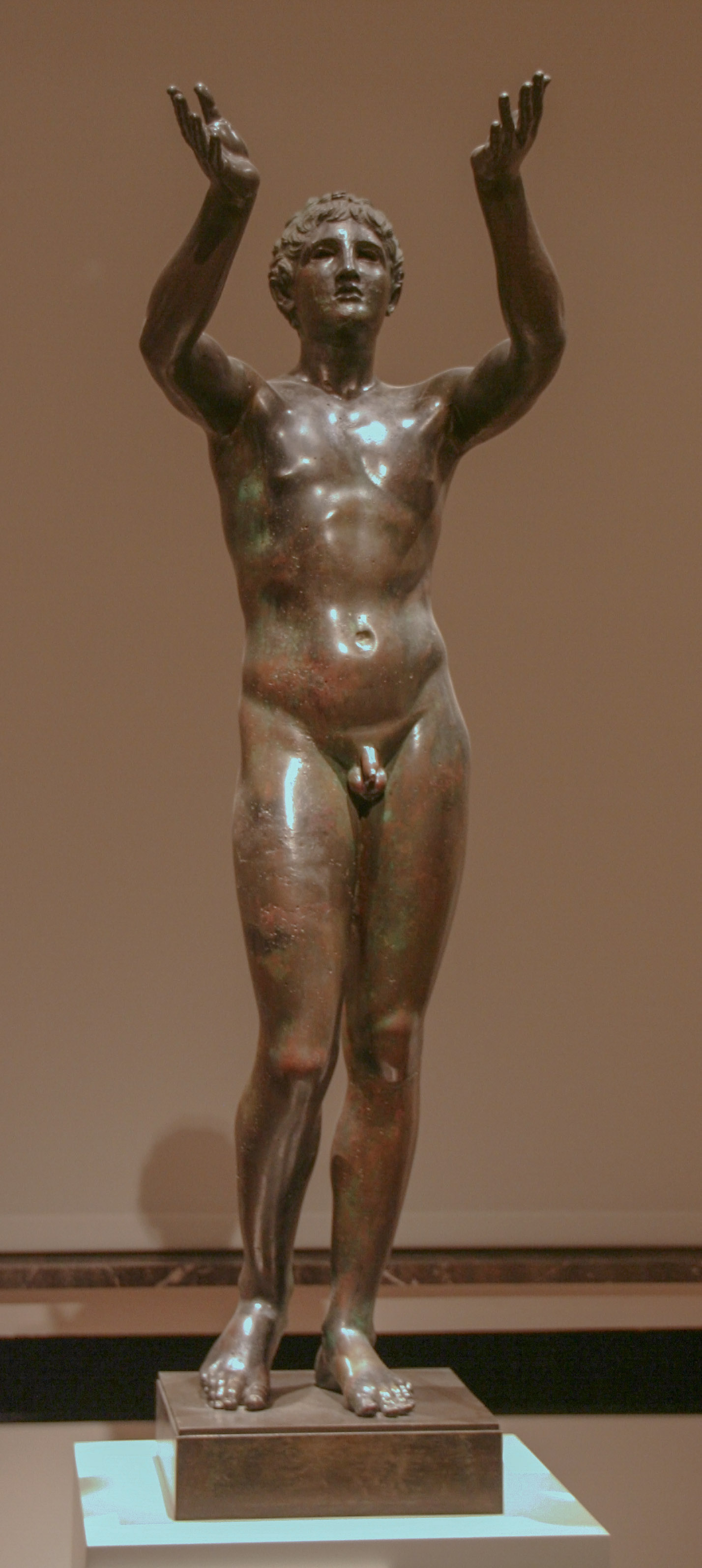
Berlin Adorant, Altes Museum
