= William Henderson (landscape gardener) =

British landscape architect (1802–1885)

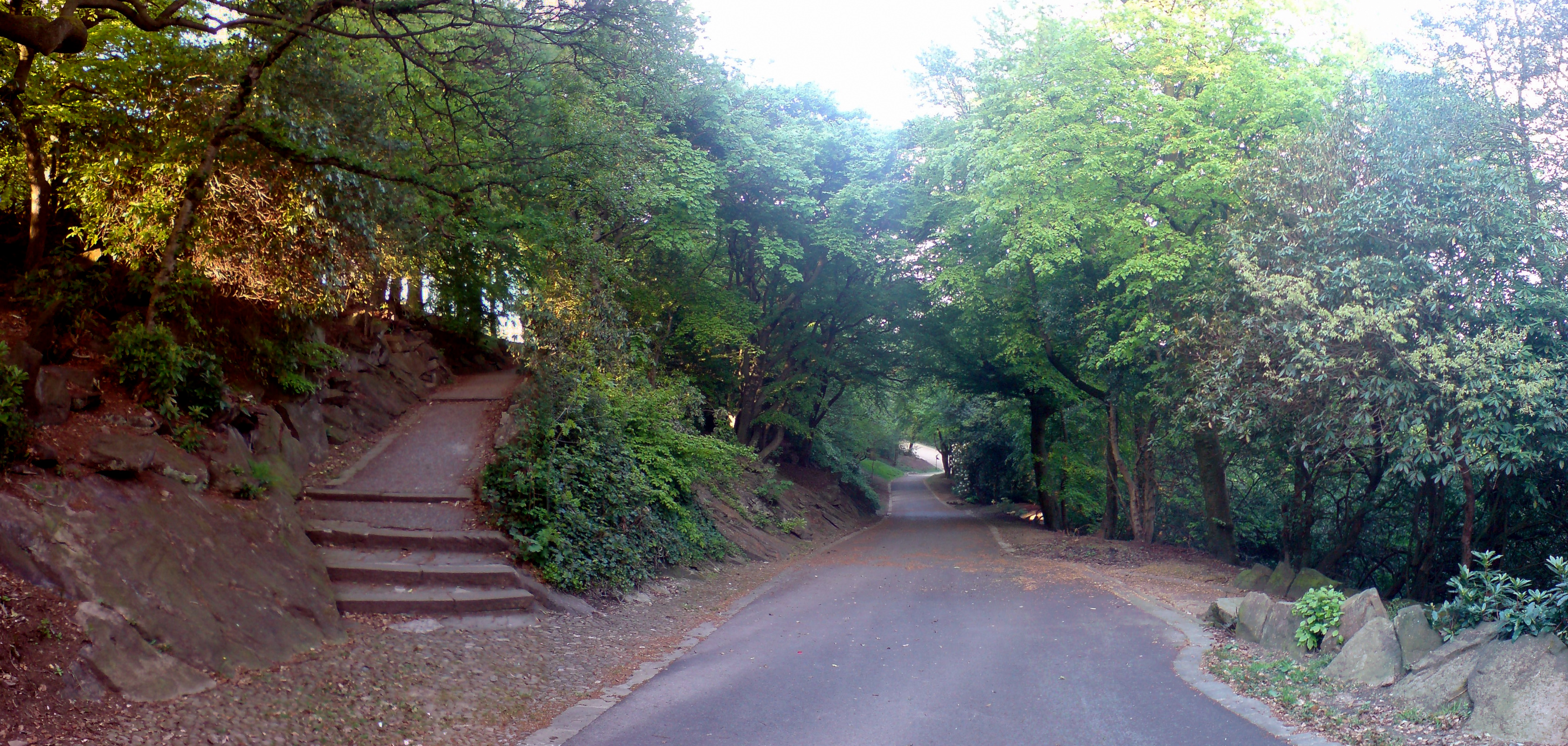
Pathway in Corporation Park, Blackburn, which was landscaped by Henderson.

William Henderson (26 May 1802 – 25 October 1885) was a landscape gardener from Birkenhead, England. He was responsible for laying out the grounds of Corporation Park, Blackburn (1857); Alexandra Park, Oldham (1865); Queen's Park, Bolton (1866). He also worked on cemeteries, including Tonge Cemetery, Bolton (1856). With a perfect circle as its basis, this is held to be an exemplar of the geometric or sub-geometric framework, the most common form of the cemeteries of the mid 19th century. A number of Henderson's works are now on English Heritage Register of Parks and Gardens.

== See also ==
- Urban park
