= Statue of Lord Curzon =

Statue in London, England

Coordinates: 51.5060°N 0.1333°W

Lord Curzon
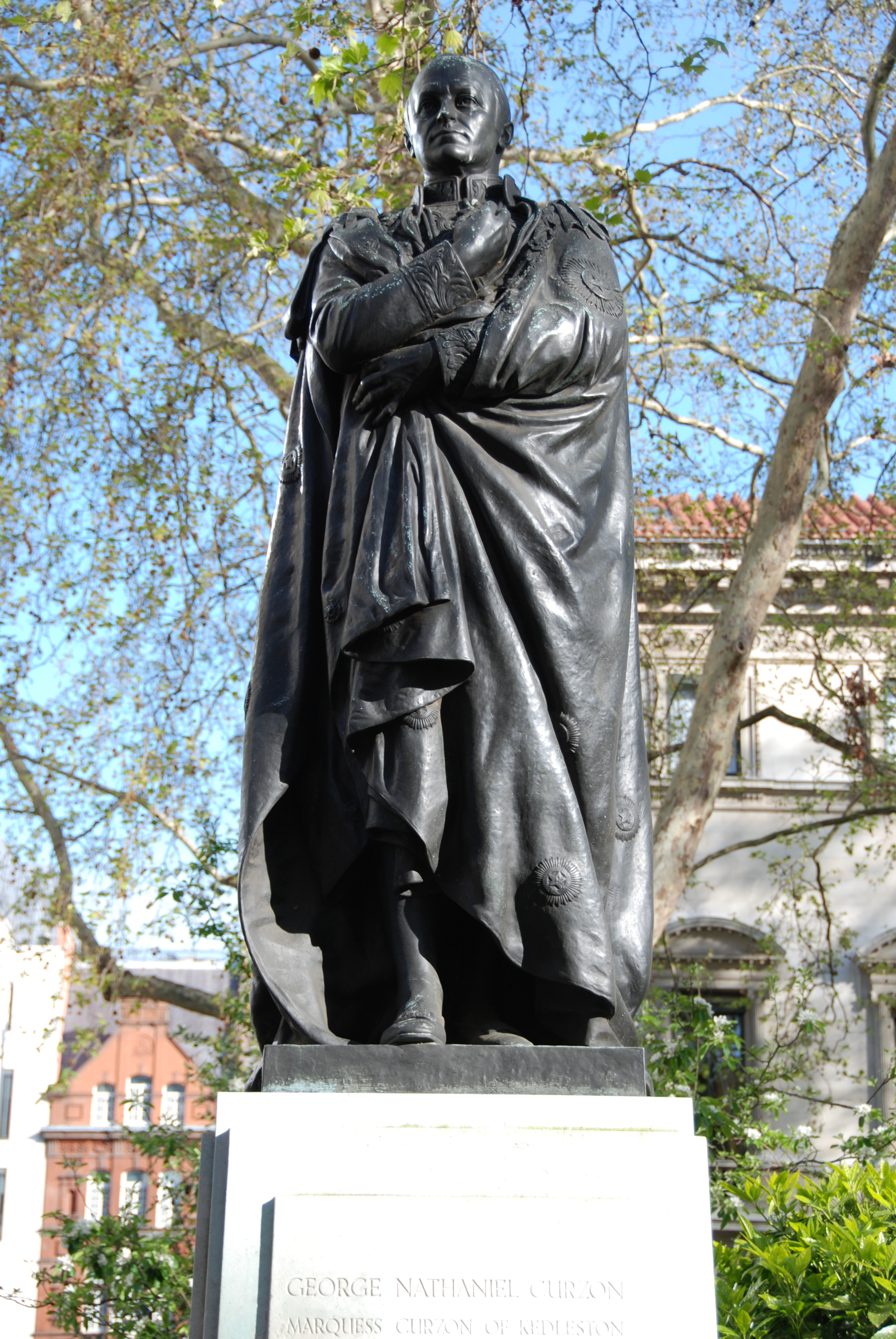
- Artist: Bertram Mackennal
- Completion date: 1931
- Subject: George Curzon, 1st Marquess Curzon of Kedleston
- Location: London

Listed Building – Grade II
- Official name: Statue of Lord Curzon
- Designated: 9 January 1970
- Reference no.: 1357273

The statue of Lord Curzon is a Grade II listed statue that stands on Carlton House Terrace in London. The statue stands opposite Curzon's home at 1 Carlton House Terrace.

Lord Curzon served as Viceroy of India and was considered to be autocratic in his rule, despite this he has been hailed for implementing a number of reforms, particularly for the better treatment of Indians. He was also known for his oratory skills, and resplendence in India, staging the Delhi Durbar. In 1923, Curzon aimed to become Prime Minister but it instead went to Stanley Baldwin.

The statue was designed by Bertram Mackennal and unveiled in 1931 by Baldwin. It depicts Curzon wearing his Garter robes. It faces his London home, where he would host popular dinner parties and often work tirelessly into the late hours of the night.
