= Blackburn War Memorial =

- Blackburn with Darwen Council
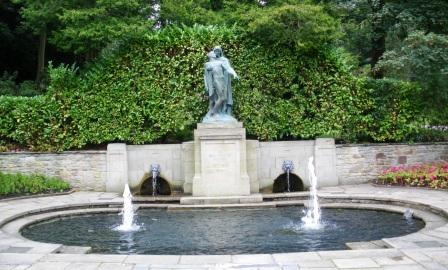
- Blackburn War Memorial
- For The dead of the First World War and Second World War.
- Unveiled: 2 August 1924
- Location: 53.752566°N 2.492315°W near Blackburn
- Designed by: Bertram Mackennal

Blackburn War Memorial is located in Corporation Park in Blackburn, Lancashire, England. It was originally designed as a memorial for people who lost their lives in the First World War but was later extended to also honour those who lost their lives in the Second World War.

The main feature of this war memorial is Bertram Mackennal's bronze sculpture known as Mother England or Sacrifice.

Plans for the memorial and Garden of Remembrance were approved by the Blackburn War Memorial Committee in October 1922 and it was unveiled on 2 August 1924.

== Gallery ==
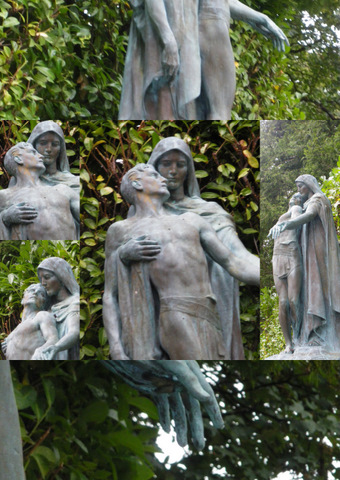
A montage of photographs of Blackburn War Memorial. "Mother England" or "Sacrifice"
