= Misneach =

Equestrian statue in Ballymun, Dublin, Ireland

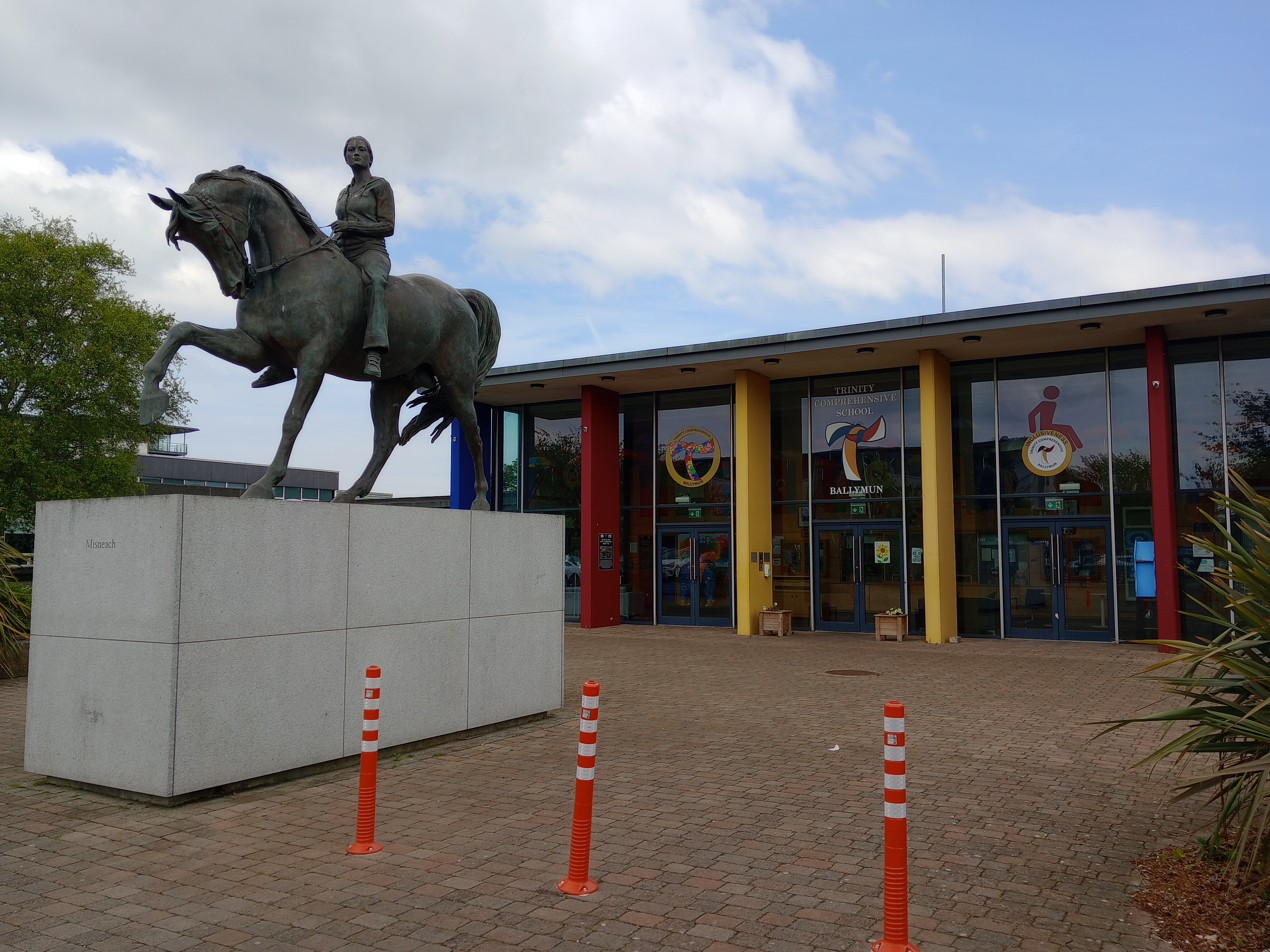
- Misneach in front of Trinity Comprehensive School

- Location within Dublin
- Interactive map of Misneach
- Location: Ballymun, Dublin, Ireland
- Coordinates: 53°23′36″N 6°15′48″W
- Designer: John Byrne
- Type: Equestrian statue
- Material: Bronze
- Completion date: 17 September 2010
- Dedicated to: Irish youth and Irish culture

Misneach (Irish: [mɪʃnˠɔx], 'Courage'), also known as Girl on Horse, is an equestrian statue by Irish artist John Byrne in Ballymun, a Northside suburb of Dublin, Ireland. The statue was commissioned as part of Ballymun Regeneration Limited's percent for art scheme Breaking Ground. It is the only equestrian statue in Dublin. It was unveiled in front of Trinity Comprehensive School on 17 September 2010, although it was originally intended to be placed at the proposed town centre on the former Ballymun Shopping Centre site. It was relocated due to plans for a proposed Ballymun MetroLink station.

The statue was cast from a mould of the Gough Monument, replacing the figure of Hugh Gough, 1st Viscount Gough with local teenager Toni Marie Shields, subverting the expectation typically associated with military imagery, as well as expectations that come with equestrian statues. Some locals have criticised it as portraying a stereotypical image of Ballymun.

== Background ==
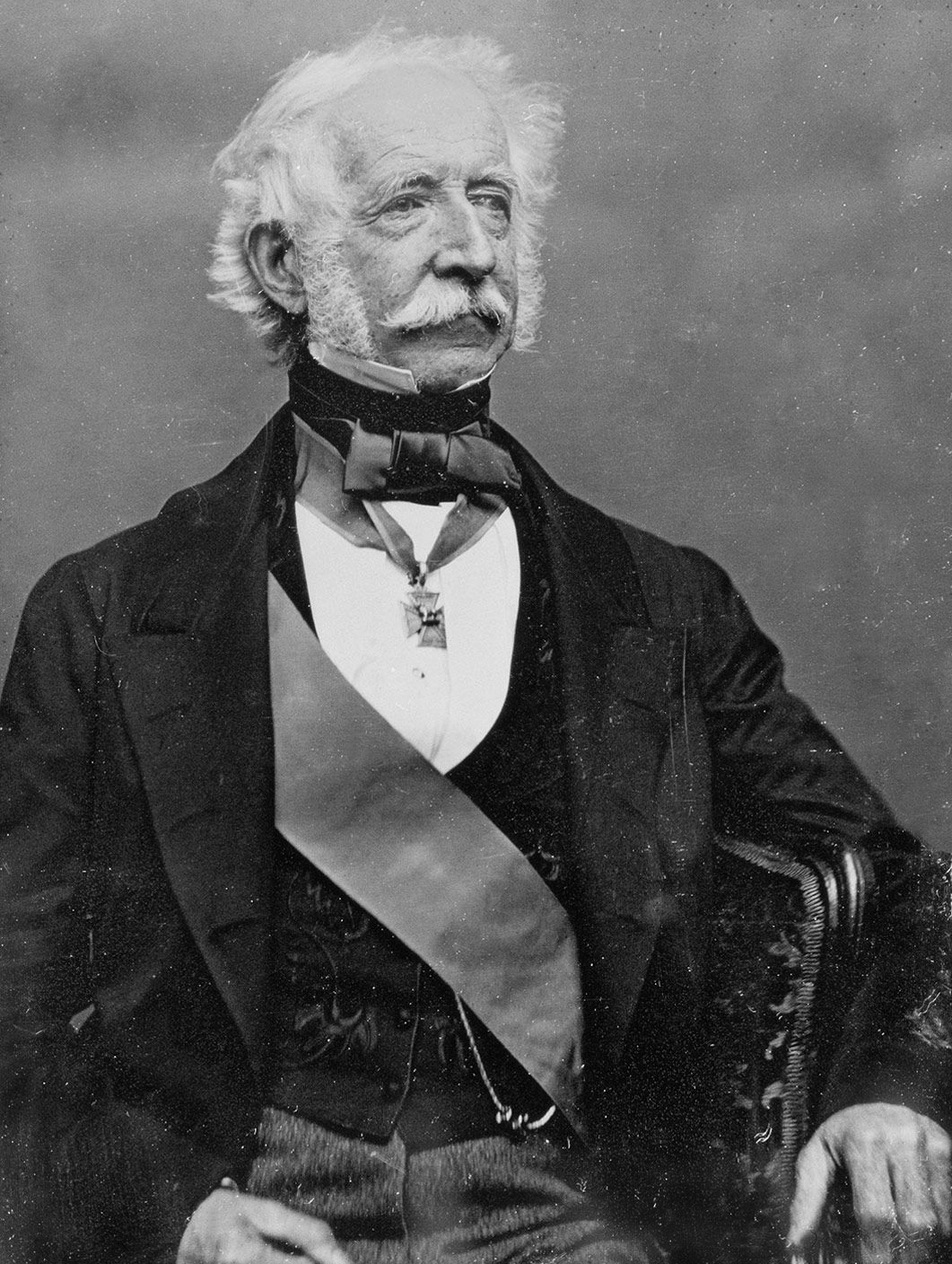
Hugh Gough, 1st Viscount Gough in 1850

Field Marshal Hugh Gough, 1st Viscount Gough, KP, GCB, GCSI, PC was born in 1779. He took part in the British invasion of the Cape Colony in September 1795 during the French Revolutionary Wars. He was deployed with the 1st Battalion of the 87th to the West Indies, taking part in the expedition to Dutch Guiana in 1799. Gough commanded the 2nd Battalion of his regiment at the Battle of Talavera in July 1809. He fought at the Battle of Barrosa, took part in the Siege of Tarifa in January 1812, the Battle of Vitoria in June 1813 and the Battle of Nivelle. He led the assault at the Battle of Canton in May 1841, and having been promoted to the local rank of lieutenant general in India and in China on 18 June 1841. He led the assault at the Battle of Amoy in August 1841. He commanded the British forces at the Battle of Chapu in May 1842 and at the Battle of Chinkiang in July 1842. After the Treaty of Nanking, the British forces were withdrawn and he returned to India. He was promoted to the local rank of full general in India on 3 March 1843. In August 1843 Gough became Commander-in-Chief, India, and in December 1843 he led the British forces in action against the Mahrattas defeating them decisively at the conclusion of the Gwalior campaign. He also commanded the troops at the Battle of Mudki in December 1845, at the Battle of Ferozeshah also in December 1845, and at the Battle of Sobraon in February 1846 during the First Anglo-Sikh War.

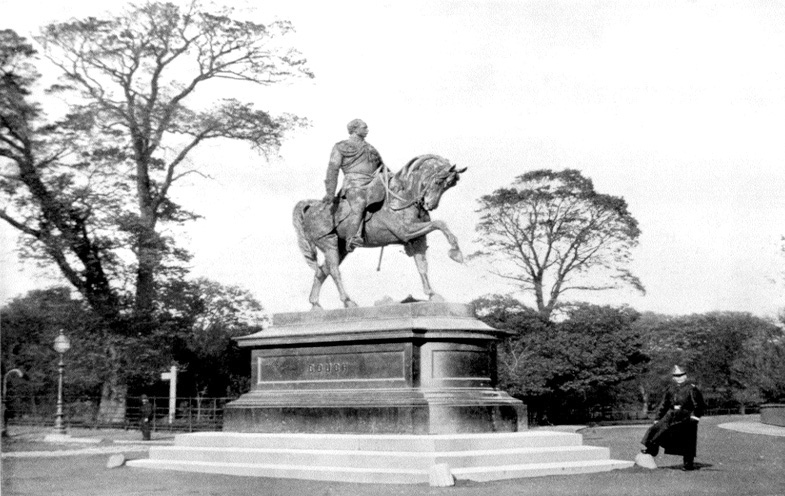
Gough Monument in Phoenix Park

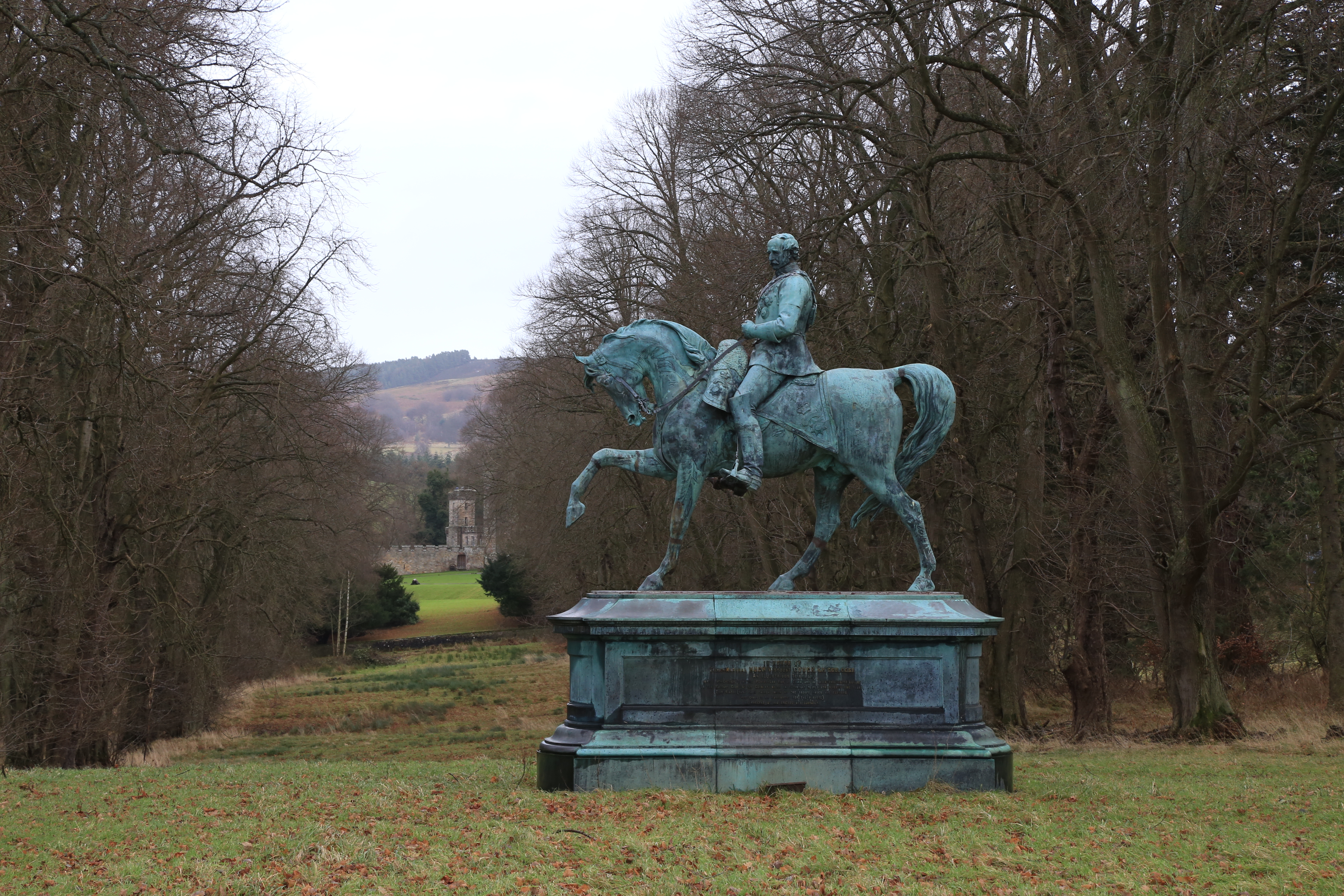
Gough Monument in Chillingham Castle, Northumberland

A horse standing in front of a regenerated Ballymun under construction

After the Second Anglo-Sikh War started in 1848, Gough took to commanding at the Battle of Ramnagar in November 1848, and at the Battle of Chillianwala in January 1849. He was criticised for relying on frontal assault by infantry rather than using artillery. He was replaced as commander-in-chief by Sir Charles Napier but, before news of his replacement had arrived, Gough achieved a decisive victory over the Sikhs in the Battle of Gujarat in February 1849. He died on 2 March 1869. History Ireland says that Gough is considered a controversial figure for fighting on the side of the colonists in the Opium War and the Sikh Wars.

John Henry Foley was commissioned to make a statue of Gough around 1868, but died before its completion, leaving his pupil Thomas Brock to finish it.

The statue was previously located in Phoenix Park in Dublin. However, after several attacks and damage sustained from an explosion caused by the Irish Republican Army (IRA), it was moved to the Royal Hospital Kilmainham. It was later purchased by businessman Robert Guinness and moved to its current location in Chillingham Castle in Northumberland, where it was restored.

In the 1960s, the Irish Government needed new housing to replace Georgian tenements in Dublin that were collapsing. They decided to construct a prefabricated housing estate in the village of Ballymun in the city's outskirts, on land bought by the Dublin Corporation (later Dublin City Council (DCC)) from the Albert Agricultural College. The housing estate contained a group of high rise tower blocks called the Ballymun Flats. Construction started in 1965 and was undertaken by a consortium of John Sisk and Son and Hadens-Cubitts. The first tenants were relocated in 1966. The housing project was completed in 1968, with additional flats being built in 1969. Residents grew unhappy with the flats. Promises to build a swimming pool and playground went unfulfilled. The block only had one shopping centre, forcing tenants to buy necessities at shops that operated out of containers. Historically, Ballymun has strong links to equestrianism and horses. Beginning in the 1980s, a subculture of "urban cowboys" became a popular hobby among Ballymun youth. The Control of Horses Act, passed in 1996, brought the subculture to near extinction. After the act was passed, locals often described themselves as having to choose between keeping the horses or selling them for drugs.

== Commissioning ==
In 1997, DCC set up the limited company Ballymun Regeneration Limited (BRL) to conduct a regeneration of the area. As part of the regeneration, BRL commissioned the percent for art scheme Breaking Ground in 2001, launching it in February 2002. Misneach was commissioned as part of the scheme in 2006. It was unveiled in front of Trinity Comprehensive School on 17 September 2010. The sculpture was originally intended to be placed at the proposed town centre on the former Ballymun Shopping Centre site, however due to plans for a proposed Ballymun MetroLink station, the sculpture was relocated. It is the first contemporary equestrian statue in Ireland, and is the last surviving equestrian statue in Dublin, with the city having four equestrian statues in its past—the Gough Monument (blown up in 1957), the Equestrian statue of George I (sold to the Barber Institute of Fine Arts in 1937), the Statue of George II (blown up in 1937), and the Statue of William of Orange (blown up 1928). The decision to display the work in front of Trinity Comprehensive may have been influenced by Philip Napier, who opted to display his work in locations that were meaningful, rather than displaying them in galleries which are viewed as more pristine.

== Design and symbolism ==
The statue depicts a 17-year-old Ballymun local, Toni Marie Shields, wearing an Adidas tracksuit on a military-style horse atop a marble podium. In September 2006, 20 Ballymun locals interested in the sculpture were brought to the Kill Equestrian Centre in Kildare to audition for it. Shields was chosen in 2007, on the grounds of posture and horsemanship, with the sculpture being based off a photograph of her riding a horse there. The bronze statue was structured from a wax mould of the Gough Monument, with Hugh Gough, 1st Viscount Gough, replaced with Shields, who underwent laser scanning in London to make a computer-generated wax mould for the sculpture. The decision to depict her riding bareback was intended to represent Ballymun's equestrian traditions, with a female rather than a male rider chosen to represent the area's youth culture. It was completed in England and shipped back to Ireland.

According to the percent for art scheme Breaking Ground and John Byrne, the sculpture subverts the expectation typically associated with military imagery, replacing the controversial Gough with an ordinary person to convey a message of "motivation, youth and womanhood". The decision to have the rider be a local teenager wearing a tracksuit was intended to represent and celebrate Irish youth and culture. Speaking for the Irish Independent, Shields said she felt that "the statue was not of her, rather it was for all the young people of the area."

== Reception ==
Some locals, including a Labour Party politician, consider the sculpture to be perpetuating a stereotype and an "unfair and subversive image of the people of Ballymun". Irish playwright Dermot Bolger, writing for the Irish Daily Mail, said what made Misneach wonderful is its "sense of democracy and equality" in a time where there "might seem to be little to celebrate in Ireland". Donal Fallon of the Irish Independent described the sculpture's depiction of an ordinary person in place of Gough as "reclaiming it for the people". In her book Tell Everyone on This Train I Love Them, Irish portrait painter Maeve Higgins compared the statue to another equestrian statue depicting a teenager as the rider in Richmond, Virginia, by Kehinde Wiley titled Rumors of War.

In the book Irish Art 1920–2020: Perspectives on Change, Paula Murphy wrote that the sculpture subverts "all aspects of the traditional equestrian monument" except the horse and the bronze casting, with the reuse of the Foley/Gough horse serving to "return an element of the sculpture to Ireland". Murphy also noted that the sculpture's move to Trinity Comprehensive School echoed the removal of the statue of Queen Victoria from Leinster House in 1948, when "carparking requirements rather than politics was offered as the scapegoat". The book Art and Architecture of Ireland Volume III: Sculpture 1600–1900 considers the statue to be "participating in a long artistic tradition of modernizing earlier work", with the work having a "symbolic focus" for a specific part of Dublin, although not representing the entire city. The book also considers Byrne's decision to cast a local girl to be replacing Gough with a "new group that was young and without power".
