= Gough Monument =

Equestrian statue in Chillingham Castle

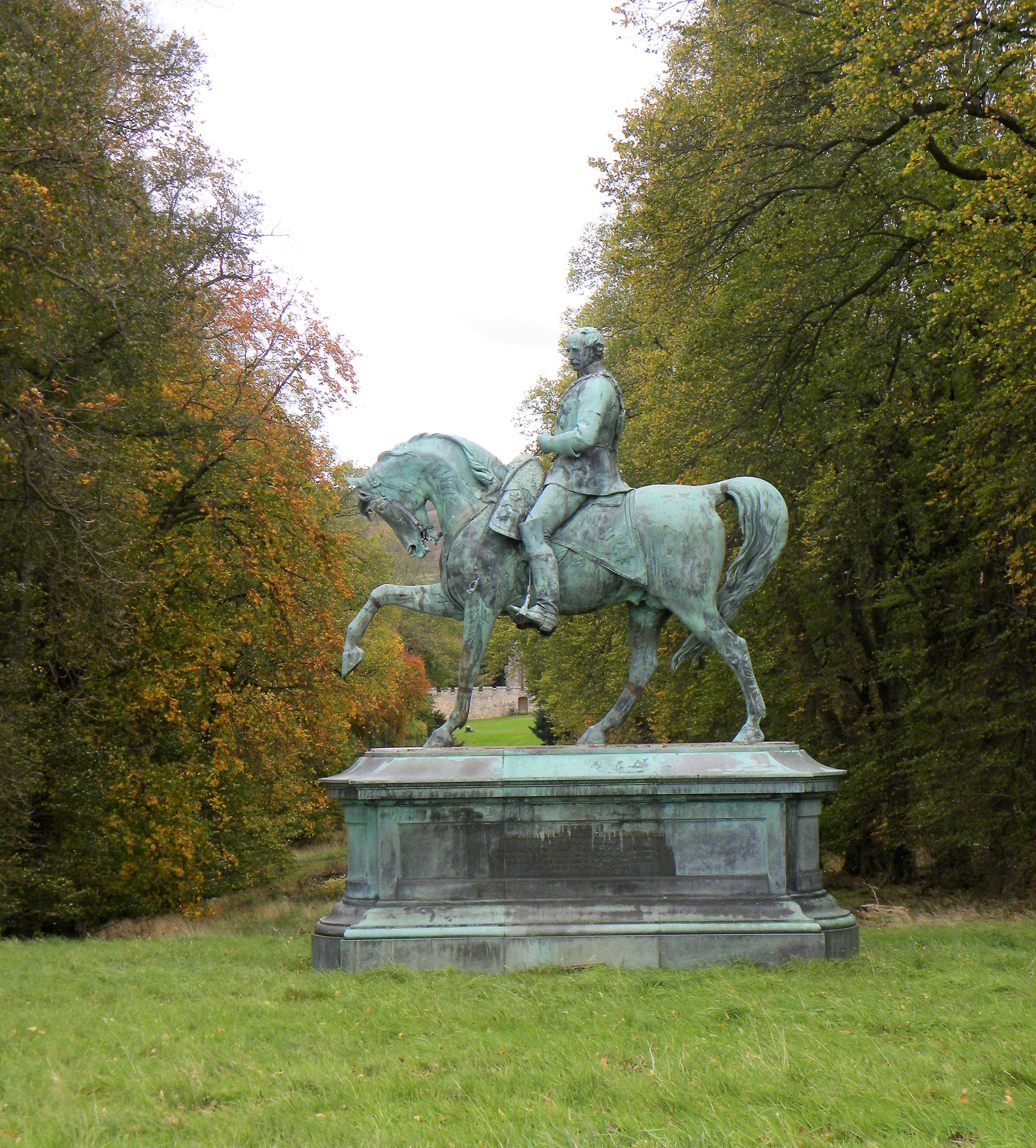
- The Gough Monument in Chillingham Castle

- Location within Northumberland
- Interactive map of Gough Monument
- Location: Chillingham Castle
- Coordinates: 55°31′35″N 1°54′42″W
- Designer: John Henry Foley
- Type: Equestrian statue
- Height: 24ft
- Weight: 15 tons (15 tonnes)
- Dedicated to: Hugh Gough, 1st Viscount Gough

The Gough Monument is an equestrian statue of Hugh Gough, 1st Viscount Gough in the grounds of Chillingham Castle in Chillingham, Northumberland, United Kingdom. John Henry Foley was commissioned to make a statue of Gough but died before its completion, leaving his pupil Thomas Brock to finish it. The statue was previously located in Phoenix Park in Dublin but after several attacks to the statue and an explosion from the Irish Republican Army (IRA), it was moved to the Royal Hospital Kilmainham. It was later purchased by Rupert Guinness, 2nd Earl of Iveagh and moved to its current location in Chillingham Castle, where it was restored.

The statue depicts Gough on a horse wearing an honorary colonel uniform of the Royal Horse Guards, with the Order of St Patrick, the Bath and the Star of India on it. The statue is on a stone pedestal with an inscription about Gough's military life.

== Background ==
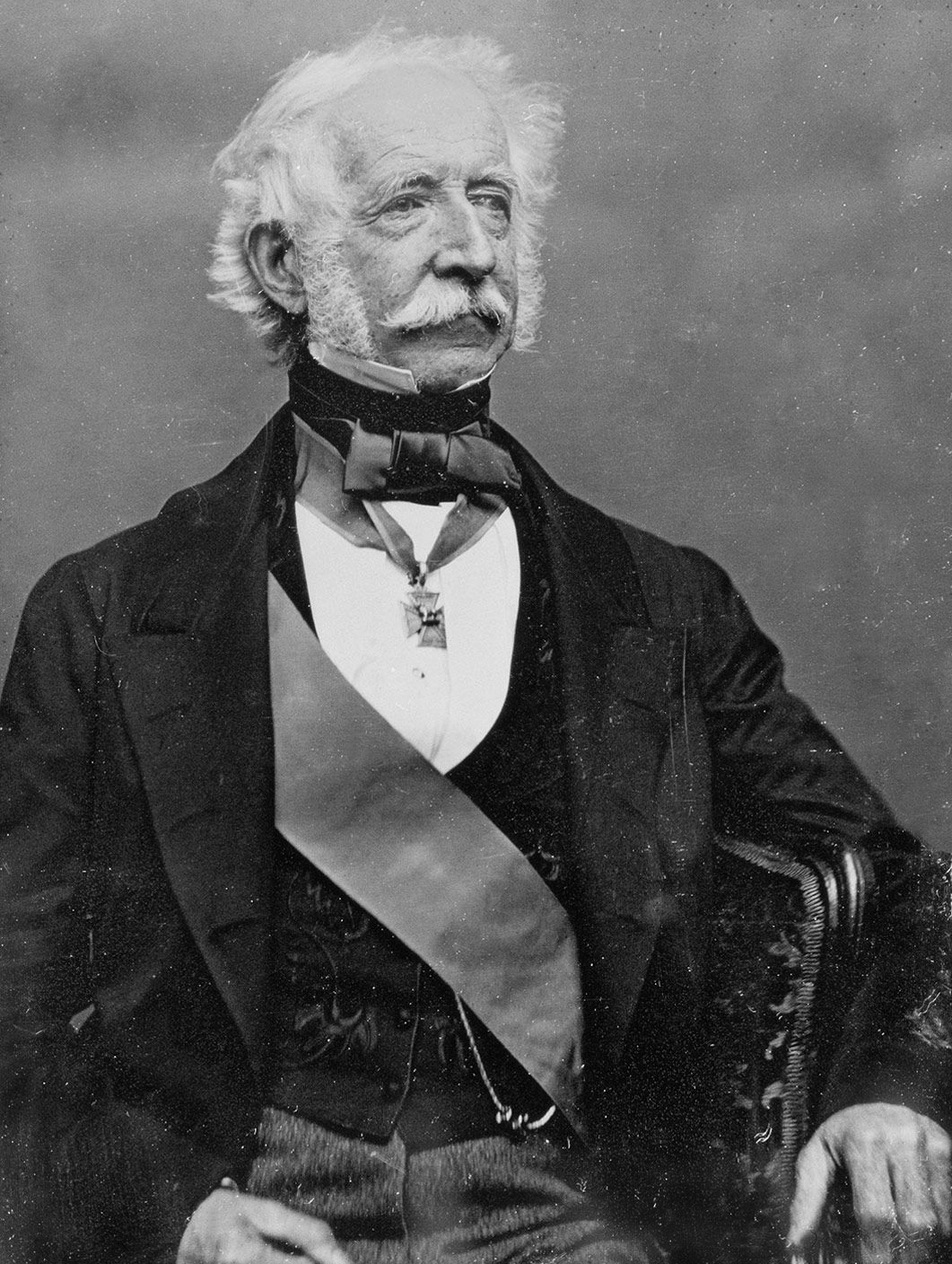
Hugh Gough, 1st Viscount Gough in 1850

Field Marshal Hugh Gough, 1st Viscount Gough, KP, GCB, GCSI, PC was born in 1779. He was commissioned into the Limerick Militia on 7 August 1793, being promoted to lieutenant in the 119th Regiment of Foot on 11 October 1794. He took part in the British invasion of the Cape Colony in September 1795 during the French Revolutionary Wars, and was deployed with the 1st Battalion of the 87th to the West Indies, taking part in the expedition to Dutch Guiana in 1799. Gough commanded the 2nd Battalion of his regiment at the Battle of Talavera in July 1809, fought at the Battle of Barrosa, took part in the Siege of Tarifa in January 1812, the Battle of Vitoria in June 1813 and the Battle of Nivelle. Gough became a Knight Commander of the Order of the Bath on 18 September 1831.

At the outset of the First Opium War in March 1839, he was appointed commander-in-chief of the British forces in China. He led the assault at the Battle of Canton in May 1841, and having been promoted to the local rank of lieutenant general in India and in China on 18 June 1841, he also led the assault at the Battle of Amoy in August 1841. Advanced to Knight Grand Cross of the Order of the Bath on 14 October 1841 and promoted to the substantive rank of lieutenant general on 23 November 1841, he commanded the British forces at the Battle of Chapu in May 1842 and at the Battle of Chinkiang in July 1842. After the Treaty of Nanking, the British forces were withdrawn and he returned to India. He was promoted to the local rank of full general in India on 3 March 1843.

In August 1843 Gough became Commander-in-Chief, India, and in December 1843 he led the British forces in action against the Mahrattas defeating them decisively at the conclusion of the Gwalior campaign. He also commanded the troops at the Battle of Mudki in December 1845, at the Battle of Ferozeshah also in December 1845 and at the Battle of Sobraon in February 1846 during the First Anglo-Sikh War. Gough was elevated to the peerage as Baron Gough of Chinkiang in China and of Maharajpore and the Sutlej in the East Indies on 7 April 1846.

== History ==
John Henry Foley was commissioned to make a statue of Gough in around 1868. Foley sketched the design but died in 1874, only having made a small model of the design. His pupil Thomas Brock was chosen to cast the design by people who subscribed to the monument. The statue was cast from 200 cannons from the Peninsular War. The casting was completed on 19 October 1878. The cast used for the horse on Foley's previous work, an equestrian statue of Henry Hardinge, 1st Viscount Hardinge, was repurposed for the Gough Monument. The statue was paid for via public subscription, with the British government providing captured guns from the First Opium War for the casting, which Brock melted, adding tin to the alloy to assist with the melting. It was originally intended to be placed in Kolkata, India, but was moved to Dublin as Foley had wanted his native city to have one of his equestrian statues. In July 1879, Dublin Town Council decided to have their committee directly work with the Gough Statue Committee to decide where to place the statue, discarding previous proposals to place the statue on Carlisle Bridge. The two committees decided in October to place the statue in Phoenix Park.

The statue depicts Gough wearing a "uniform of honorary colonel of the Royal Horse Guards" on a horse with a design described by The Times as "noble". Gough is depicted with the Order of St Patrick, the Bath and the Star of India on his breast, holding a sword and a Field Marshal baton. The statue's pedestal has an inscription that states the following:

In honour of Field-Marshal Hugh, Viscount Gough, K.P., G.O.B., G.C.S.I., an illustrious Irishman, whose achievements in the Peninsular War, in China and in India, have added lustre to the military glory of his country, which he faithfully served for 75 years. This statue, cast from cannon taken by the troops under his command, and granted by Parliament for the purpose, is erected by his friends and comrades

On Christmas Eve 1944, vandals cut off the statue's head and sword with a hacksaw. In November 1956, the statue's right hind leg was blown off with dynamite, after which the statue was reinforced with wooden planks. The following year in January, the Government of Ireland put the monument under police guard as part of an effort to protect it from the IRA. On 23 July 1957, an IRA mine explosion shattered the statue, knocking it off its stone pedestal. The Irish Republican Publicity Bureau issued a statement two days later denying involvement, but contemporary and later sources have consistently attributed the attack to the IRA. The Gardaí detained six men at Bridewell Garda station in Smithfield in connection with the explosion. The statue was moved to the Office of Public Works' yard in the Royal Hospital Kilmainham.

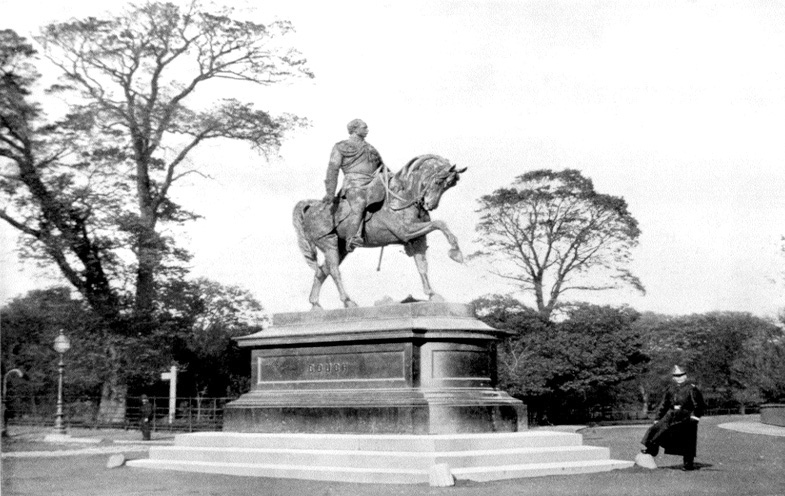
Gough Monument on its stone pedestal in Phoenix Park prior to its explosion and relocation

In 1986, the Office of Public Works sold the statue to Rupert Guinness, 2nd Earl of Iveagh, with a condition that "the Gough statue should be taken out of the State". Guinness brought the statue to the Chillingham Castle in Northumberland to restore it. The Office of Public Works, Guinness and the (at the time) Minister for Finance, Ray MacSharry, entered into a discussion on whether or not to bring the statue back to Dublin, but eventually decided to keep the statue in Northumberland, where it currently resides.

== Reception and legacy ==
In 2010, a wax mould of the Gough Monument was used to structure Misneach in Ballymun. A 2014 issue of Éire-Ireland described the 1957 explosion as being symbolic of a "new political order attempting to erase the marks of British rule" In 2022, Marshall Catherine and Yvonne Scott described the explosion as an attempt to "erase rather than interrogate" the history of British rule in Ireland.

== See also ==
- Equestrian statue of Marcus Aurelius
- List of equestrian statues in the United Kingdom
