= Guards Crimean War Memorial =

Memorial in London to the Crimean War

The Guards Crimean War Memorial
- United Kingdom
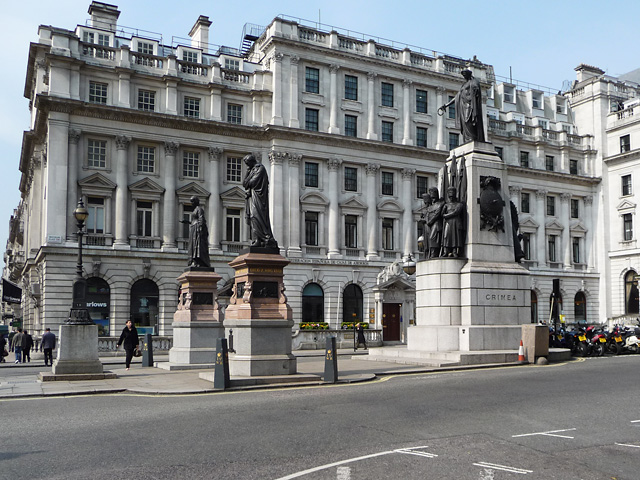
- For the Allied victory and those who died in the Crimean War
- Unveiled: 1861 (relocated 1915)
- Location: 51°30′26.46″N 0°7′57.71″W; St James's, London
- Designed by: John Henry Foley and Arthur George Walker
- CRIMEA

The Guards Crimean War Memorial is a Grade II listed memorial in St James's, London, that commemorates the Allied victory in the Crimean War of 1853–56. It is located on Waterloo Place, at the junction of Regent Street and Pall Mall, approximately one-quarter of the way from the Duke of York Column to Piccadilly Circus.

== Description and history ==
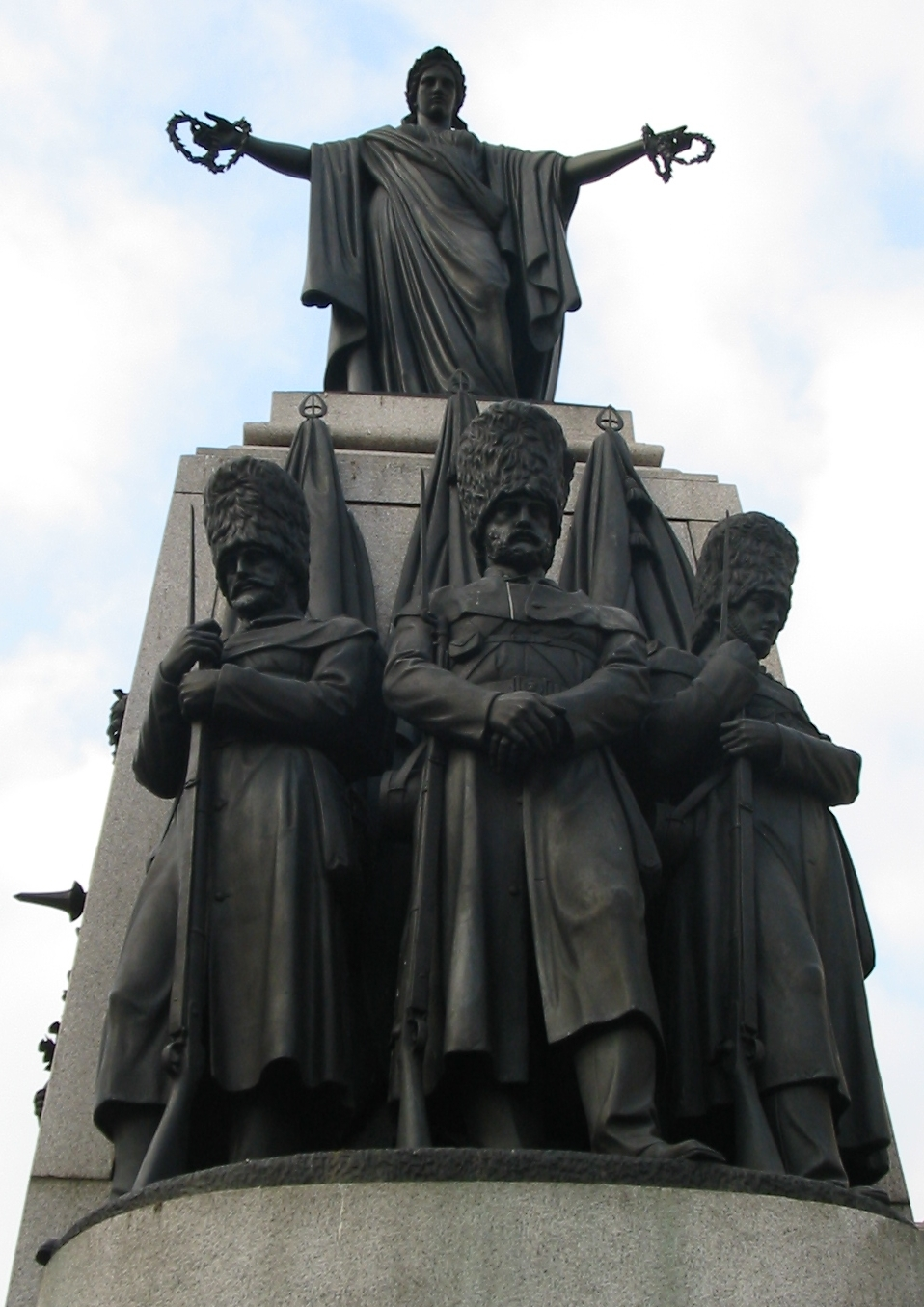
Detail of the Guards' Memorial

It was unveiled in 1861 and consisted of the statues of three Guardsmen, with a female allegorical figure referred to as Honour. It was cast in bronze, with components cast from cannons melted down that had been captured at the siege of Sevastopol. The sculptor was John Bell.

On the front, by the statues of the Guardsmen, are two plaques. The older one states:

The foundation stone of the Guards' Memorial was laid in the year of our lord 1861 by Margaret Johanna Bell.

The other plaque reads:

The Guards' Memorial was pulled down in the year of our lord 1914 and was re-erected 30 feet north in order to permit the erection of the Florence Nightingale and Sidney Herbert statues.

On the back facade of the monuments, facing the road up to Piccadilly is another plaque, a shield surrounded by foliage and mounted on guns. This reads:

To the memory of 2152 Officers, Non-Com. Officers and Privates of the BRIGADE OF GUARDS who fell during the war with Russia in 1854–56. Erected by their Comrades.

The mournful attitude of Bell's figures caused some controversy, as it contrasted with the heroic poses expected of war memorials at that time. An anonymous critic writing in The Illustrated London News described it as "an eyesore" and wrote that the figure of Honour resembled "a street acrobat throwing his four rings".

In 1914, the monument was moved northwards to make room for new statues of Florence Nightingale and Sidney Herbert who was Secretary at War during the Crimean War. It is only then that the allegorical figure was referred to as Victory. The sculpture of Nightingale was by Arthur George Walker, and the sculpture of Herbert was by John Henry Foley.
