= Statue of Sidney Herbert, London =

Statue in London, England

Statue of Sidney Herbert
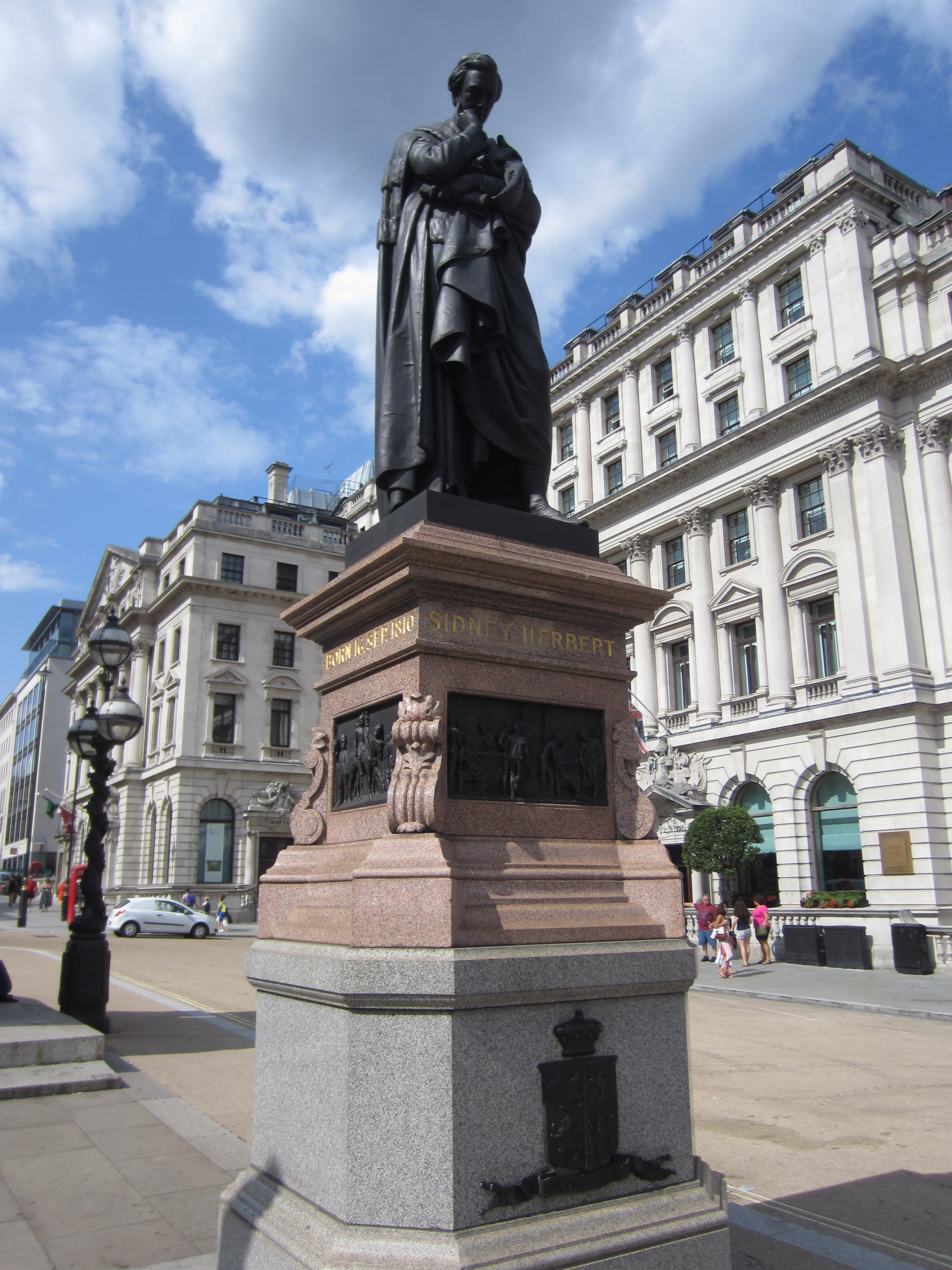
- The statue in 2014
- Artist: John Henry Foley
- Subject: Sidney Herbert, 1st Baron Herbert of Lea
- Location: London, England; 51.50734°N 0.13256°W

The statue of Sidney Herbert, 1st Baron Herbert of Lea is an outdoor sculpture in London, England. Created by J. H. Foley, it was erected by public subscription in 1867 and was originally placed in the courtyard of Cumberland House, Pall Mall (which at the time was the headquarters of the War Office). It moved with the War Office to Whitehall in 1906, where it was placed (out of public sight) in the courtyard of the new War Office building; but eight years later it was moved again to Waterloo Place to stand alongside the Crimean War Memorial, where it is paired with a statue of Herbert's friend and fellow reformer Florence Nightingale.

== See also ==
- Crimean War Memorial
- Statue of Florence Nightingale, London
