= John Byrne (Irish artist) =

Irish visual artist

- Born: November 1959 (age 66); Belfast, Northern Ireland
- Education: Belfast School of Art
- Website: http://www.john-byrne.ie/

John Byrne (born November 1959) is an Irish artist born in Belfast, Northern Ireland, now living and working in Dublin.

== Early life ==
Byrne was born in Belfast in November 1959.

Byrne received his degree from the Belfast School of Art in Belfast. After graduation, he began practising as a performance artist while attending the Slade School of Art in London in the mid-1980s.

== Career ==
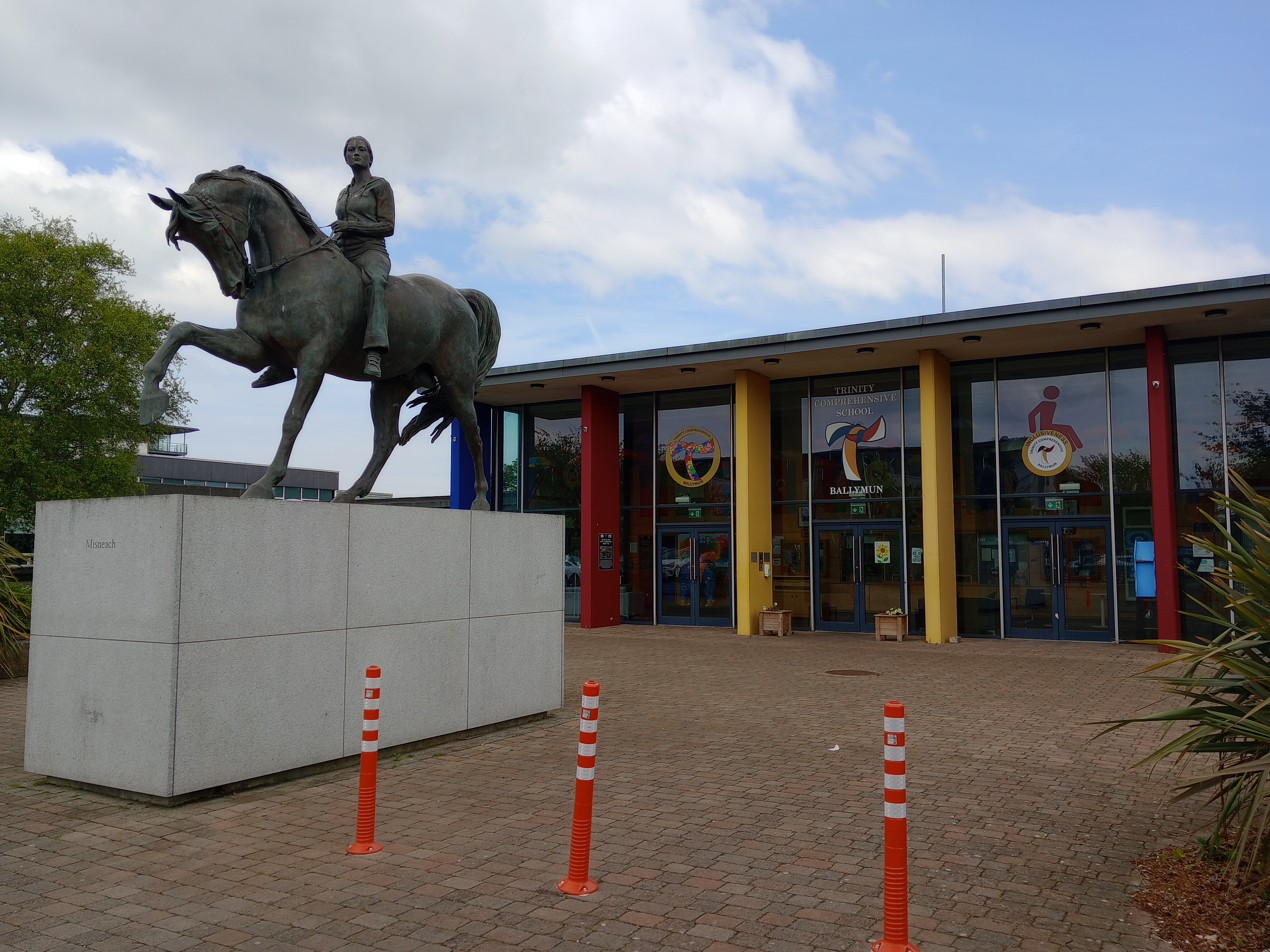
Misneach by John Byrne

The work examines ideas around patriotism and nationalism.

In 2004 Byrne produced a large public artwork Dublin's Last Supper which was commissioned by building developer Mick Wallace (M&J Wallace Ltd) in central Dublin. It is a 9 metre by 2 metre photo screen-print on steel panels featuring 13 people encountered on the streets of Dublin in the form of an interpretation of Leonardo da Vinci's masterpiece. The work was meant to be reflective of a changing society and the growing cultural mix in Dublin.

In June 2005 his video Believers premiered at the Crawford Municipal Art Gallery, Cork. In this work, Byrne is the central protagonist.

Misneach is a major permanent sculptural work commissioned as part of Breaking Ground's Public Art programme. This monumental bronze sculpture of a horse and rider is rendered in a style typical of the European tradition of portraying generals or heads of state. The horse is a copy of the Gough Memorial originally sited in the Phoenix Park which was blown up in 1957. The rider is modelled on a teenage girl native of Ballymun. The completed monument was mounted on a plinth and unveiled in September 2010.

In August 2010 he presented Casting Light a video projection mapped onto the façade of a bank in Cavan which was showcased during the Fleadh Cheoil. This included a segment where the bank appeared as a giant fruit machine. An updated version was featured in 2012. Byrne is working on a number of commissions including a per cent for artwork for the Loreto School in Balbriggan and a new collaborative work with The Palestrina Choir entitled Good Works commissioned through Create.

== See also ==
Artists from Northern Ireland
