= Cumberland House =

Mansion in London, England

Coordinates: 51°30′21″N 0°8′7″W

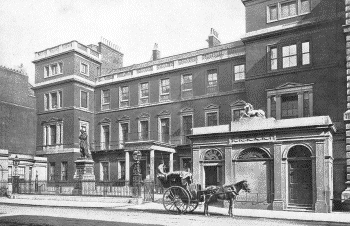
Cumberland House, circa 1896

Cumberland House was a mansion on the south side of Pall Mall in London, England. It was built in the 1760s by Matthew Brettingham for Prince Edward, Duke of York and Albany and was originally called York House. The Duke of York died in 1767 aged just twenty-eight and the house was taken over by Prince Henry, Duke of Cumberland and Strathearn, whose name it has retained. The house was demolished in stages between 1908 and 1911, and the site is now occupied by the Royal Automobile Club.

== Description ==
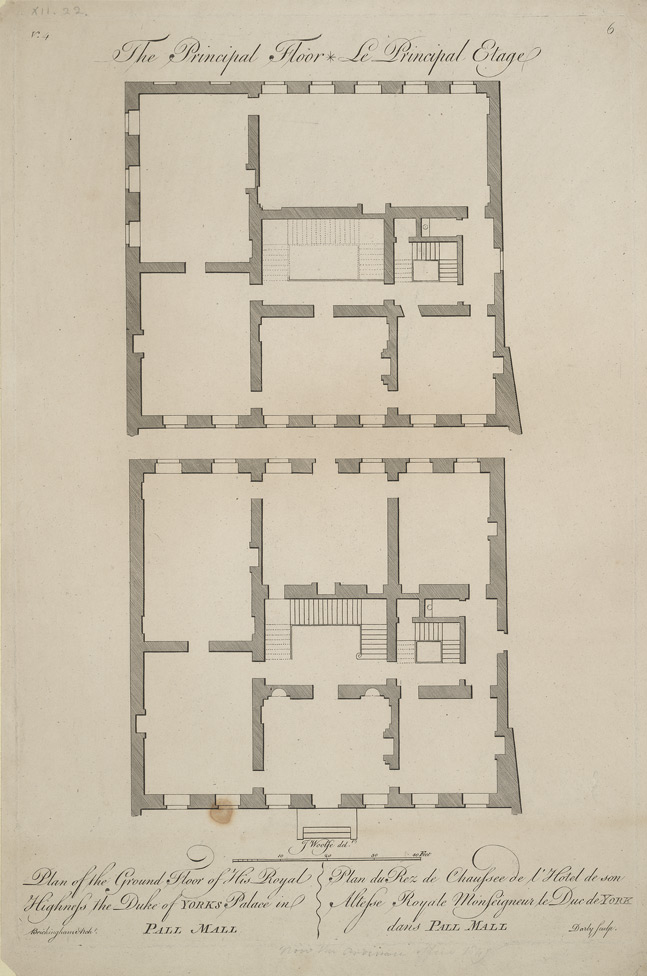
Plans of the ground and first floors of York (later Cumberland) House as designed by Matthew Brettingham.

Brettingham's house was in a late Palladian style. It was seven bays wide with three main storeys plus basement and attics and was built of brick with stone dressings. The Duke of Cumberland made various alterations. He built a projecting west wing on the site of a neighbouring house that he purchased and added a pair of lodges flanking the forecourt, probably all to designs by Robert Adam. Adam also made many designs for remodelling the interiors, which are now in the collection at the Sir John Soane's Museum, but only a few of them were carried out.

The Duke of Cumberland died in 1790, and in 1800, the widowed Duchess surrendered it to the banks who held mortgages on it.

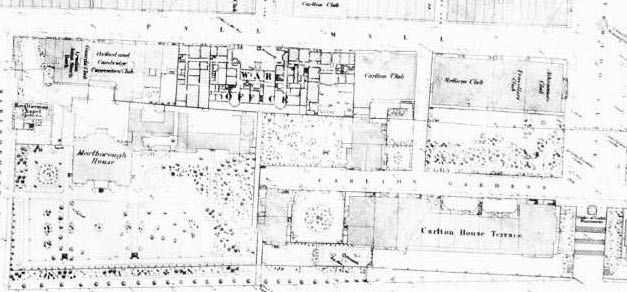
This map of circa 1870 shows Cumberland House as the central element of the War Office.

The house was sold to the Union Club in 1801 and in 1806 it was purchased by the Board of Ordnance. From 1858 it housed the War Office; a statue of Sidney Herbert was placed in the front courtyard in 1867. An eastern counterpart to the west wing was added in 1809. Cumberland House was used by the government for just over a hundred years. The War Office also acquired several neighbouring houses, including Schomberg House, and knocked them together to form a large office complex. Cumberland House was demolished in stages between 1908 and 1911. The site is now occupied by the Royal Automobile Club.

== See also ==
- List of demolished buildings and structures in London

== Notes ==
- London's Mansions by David Pearce, (1986) ISBN 0-7134-8702-X
