= Statue of Florence Nightingale, London =

Statue in London, United Kingdom

Statue of Florence Nightingale
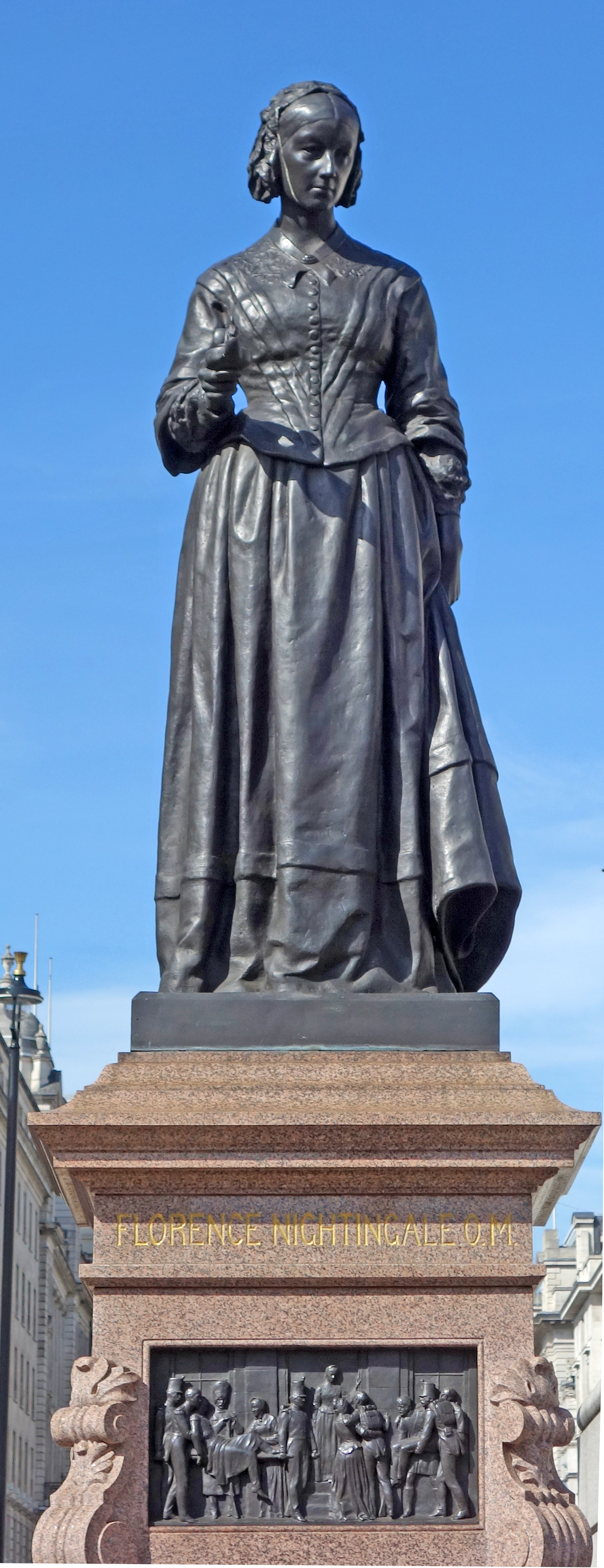
- Subject: Florence Nightingale
- Location: London, United Kingdom; 51°30′26″N 0°07′57″W

A Grade II-listed statue of Florence Nightingale is installed in London, United Kingdom. It was sculpted in 1915 by Arthur George Walker, and is a subsidiary part of the Guards Crimean War Memorial.

== See also ==
- Statue of Sidney Herbert, London
