= Kill Equestrian Centre =

Former equestrian statue in Kildare

- Interactive map of the Kill Equestrian Centre area

General information
- Location: Kill, County Kildare, Ireland
- Coordinates: 53°14′18″N 6°35′58″W
- Opened: 1923
- Closed: 2017

The Kill Equestrian Centre, also known as the Kill International Equestrian Centre is a former equestrian facility in Kill, County Kildare, Ireland. The centre ran pony camps for children and gave horse riding lessons. The centre also trained people for horsing careers. It was certified with the British Horse Society. In 2003, it was used as a venue for the 2003 Special Olympics World Games in Ireland.

== History ==
The Kill Equestrian Centre was founded by Harry Kellett in 1923. In October 1992, the final Irish Grand Prix horse show of the season, Champions of the Year was held at Kill Equestrian. In April 1994, Kill Equestrian, in conjunction with the St. Patrick's post primary school in Naas, started running a Business Accommodation and Equine Studies course. In October 1994, Penco Insurance's Summer League was held at Kill Equestrian. In October 1995, the Champions of the Year show was again held at Kill Equestrian. In April 1996, the Irish Dressage Society national winter finals were held at Kill Equestrian. In October 1996, the Champion of the Year show was again held at Kill Equestrian. In November 1998, the Champions of the Year show was again held at Kill Equestrian. On 23 September 2000, the National Irish Draught Performance Championships were held at Kill Equestrian. In 2001, Kill Equestrian was one of the venues for the 2003 Special Olympics World Games in Ireland. In 2004, the opening round of the Blessington Show was held at Kill Equestrian. In November 2004, the Leinster Indoor Horse Championships were held at Kill Equestrian. In May 2006, the Rolestown Grand Prix was held at Kill Equestrian. In October 2006, the Leinster Indoor Pony Championships were held at Kill Equestrian. In November 2006, the Cannon Kirk Homes Champions of the Year Show was held at Kill Equestrian. In July 2007, the Blessington Show was again held at Kill Equestrian. In August 2007, the South Dublin Horse Show was held at Kill Equestrian.

In 2011, the building was severely damaged after major floods. In 2016, the centre was sold to Goldman Sachs, who sold it to property developers Newstownsland (Kill) Ltd., who applied to demolish the buildings. This application was denied by Kildare County Council.

On 4 November 2022, after concerns from local residents concerning the site turning into accommodations for Ukrainian refugees fleeing the Russo-Ukrainian war, the Department of Children, Equality, Disability, Integration and Youth announced that they were in talks with Kildare County Council and the owners of Kill Equestrian on what to do with the former Kill Equestrian Site. Two days later, a fire broke out at the centre. This fire caused locals to protest turning the centre into refugee accommodations. In March, the Department of Children, Equality, Disability, Integration and Youth announced that the first Ukrainian refugees would be arriving by Easter.
