= Battle of Chinkiang =

1842 battle of the First Opium War

Coordinates: 32°11′11″N 119°25′11″E

- Part of the First Opium War
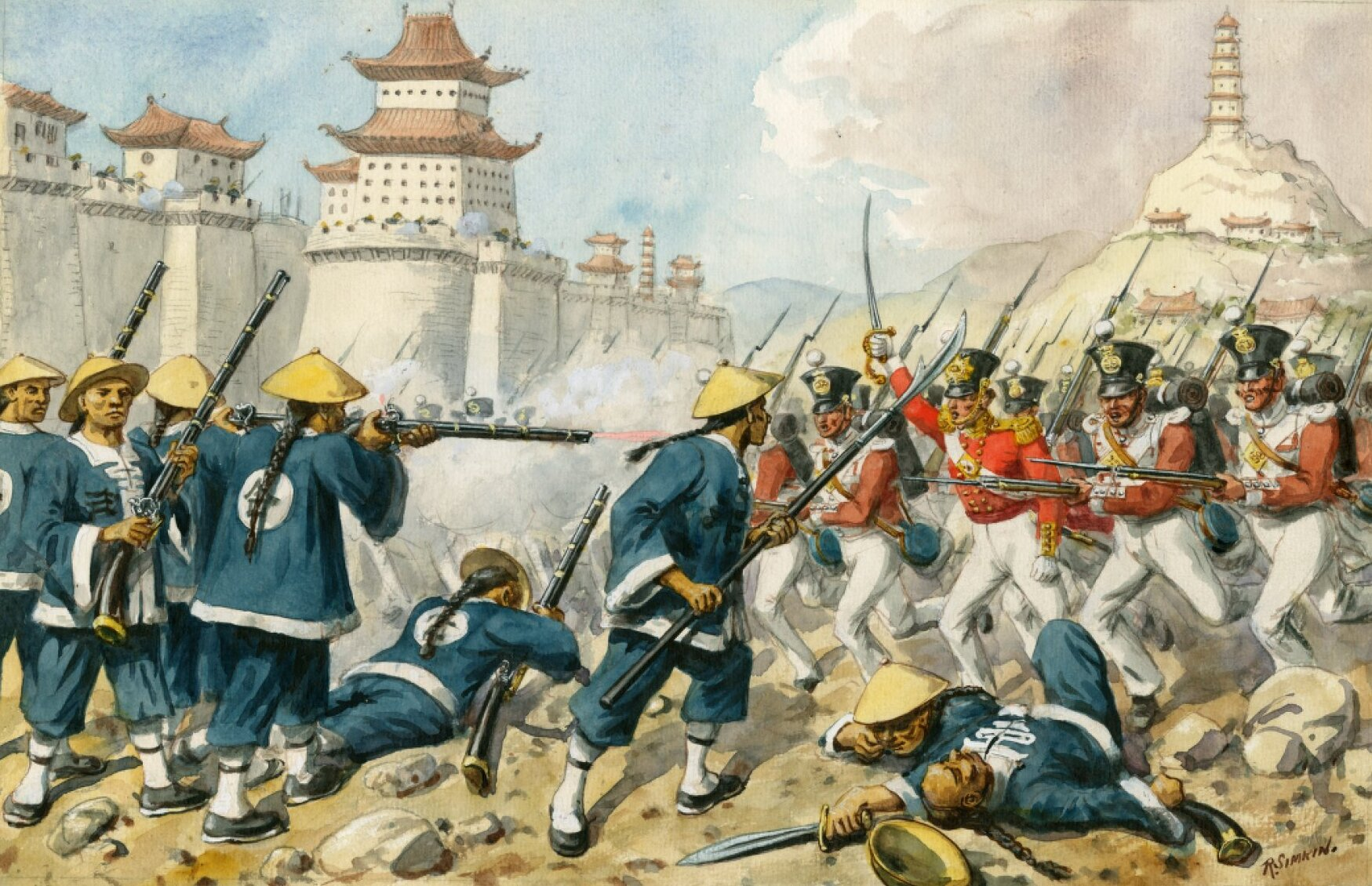
- The 98th Foot charging at Green Standard Army musketeers during the battle
Date	21 July 1842
Location	Zhenjiang, Jiangsu
Result	British victory

Belligerents
United Kingdom: British East India Company	Qing China

Commanders and leaders
Hugh Gough; Colin Campbell	Hai Ling †

Strength
6,907 troops	3,000–4,000 troops (est.)

Casualties and losses
Land: 34 killed; 107 wounded; 3 missing; Naval: 3 killed; 21 wounded'; Total: 37 killed; 128 wounded; 3 missing	1,000 killed or wounded

The Battle of Chinkiang (Chinese: 鎮江之戰) was fought between British and Chinese forces in Zhenjiang (Chinkiang), Jiangsu province, China, on 21 July 1842 during the First Opium War. It was the last major battle of the war. The Chinese force consisted of a garrison of Manchu and Mongol Bannermen. In command of the British forces was Sir Hugh Gough. Leading one brigade was future British field marshal Sir Colin Campbell. The British capture of this stronghold allowed them to proceed to Nanjing. Fought near the confluence of the Grand Canal and Yangtze River, the battle effectively blocked operation of the Caoyun system, a transport network vital for the movement of grain throughout the empire. As a result, the Daoguang Emperor decided to sue for peace and agreed to sign the Treaty of Nanking, which brought hostilities to an end. Mass suicide was committed by the Manchu Bannermen who were defending the city.

== Battle ==
In mid-July, the British ships concentrated on Zhenjiang and blocked the route between the Yangtze River and the Grand Canal. On the morning of July 21, the British attacked Zhenjiang from three directions with four brigades. With the support of an artillery brigade, 2,310 soldiers of the first brigade attacked the Qing army defending the outside of Zhenjiang. 1,832 soldiers of the second brigade attacked the west gate with the support of the navy, and 2,155 soldiers of the third brigade attacked the north gate. At that time, there were 1,583 Bannermen in Zhenjiang and 2,700 Green Standard Army troops in the south-west suburb. The Green Standard Army had been transferred from other provinces after the fort outside the city had been attacked. The Green Standard Army troops, who had been temporarily concentrated, were not familiar with the terrain of Zhenjiang. Except for a small number of muskets, their weapons were swords and spears.

At 7 a.m., the British third brigade landed at Beigu mountain and attacked the north gate, covered by heavy artillery fire from British warships. The Bannermen guarding the north gate immediately shot with muskets, injuring two British captains. The Bannermen dismantled some battlements and hastily set up artillery to counter-attack. After a fierce battle of more than an hour, the artillery of the Bannermen was destroyed and the British troops rushed the battery from the side. The defenders fought the British on the wall of the city.

Before dawn, the British first brigade successfully landed and occupied the highlands near Jinshan. At 8 a.m., the British began their attack on the Green Standard Army stationed outside the city. The Green Standard Army troops had travelled a long distance to reinforce the city and were tired from their journey, as well as lacking sufficient food. After fierce battle, they were defeated. The commander of Green Standard Army saw fires inside Zhenjiang and thought that the city had been lost, so he ordered the remaining soldiers to retreat. Many Green Standard Army soldiers became deserters.

The west gate was the main focus of the British attack on the city. Shortly after the battle between the north gate and the south-west suburb, the British second brigade began to attack the west gate. Soldiers of the two regiments occupied some houses outside the city, to shoot at the defending garrison from under cover. Meanwhile, a ship carrying British marines sailed along the canal to the west gate, from where they planned to attack the city. The west gate garrison fired at the British army on land and the marine corps in the canal, injuring 16 sailors, eight gunners and an officer, and forcing the British to withdraw from the canal within 10 minutes.

After that, the British army sent another 200 marines to strengthen the land force and renew the attack on Zhenjiang, after which they successfully occupied some of the city buildings, fighting fierce street battles with the defenders. At noon, the British sent a team of engineers to blow up the west gate with gunpowder. At the same time, the British third brigade, occupying the north gate, rushed to the west gate, and finally the Qing defence was broken. At least 40 British officers and soldiers were injured or killed in the street fighting.

After the British completed their seizure of the city, Hai Ling, the supreme commander of the Qing army, and his family, committed suicide.

== Gallery ==
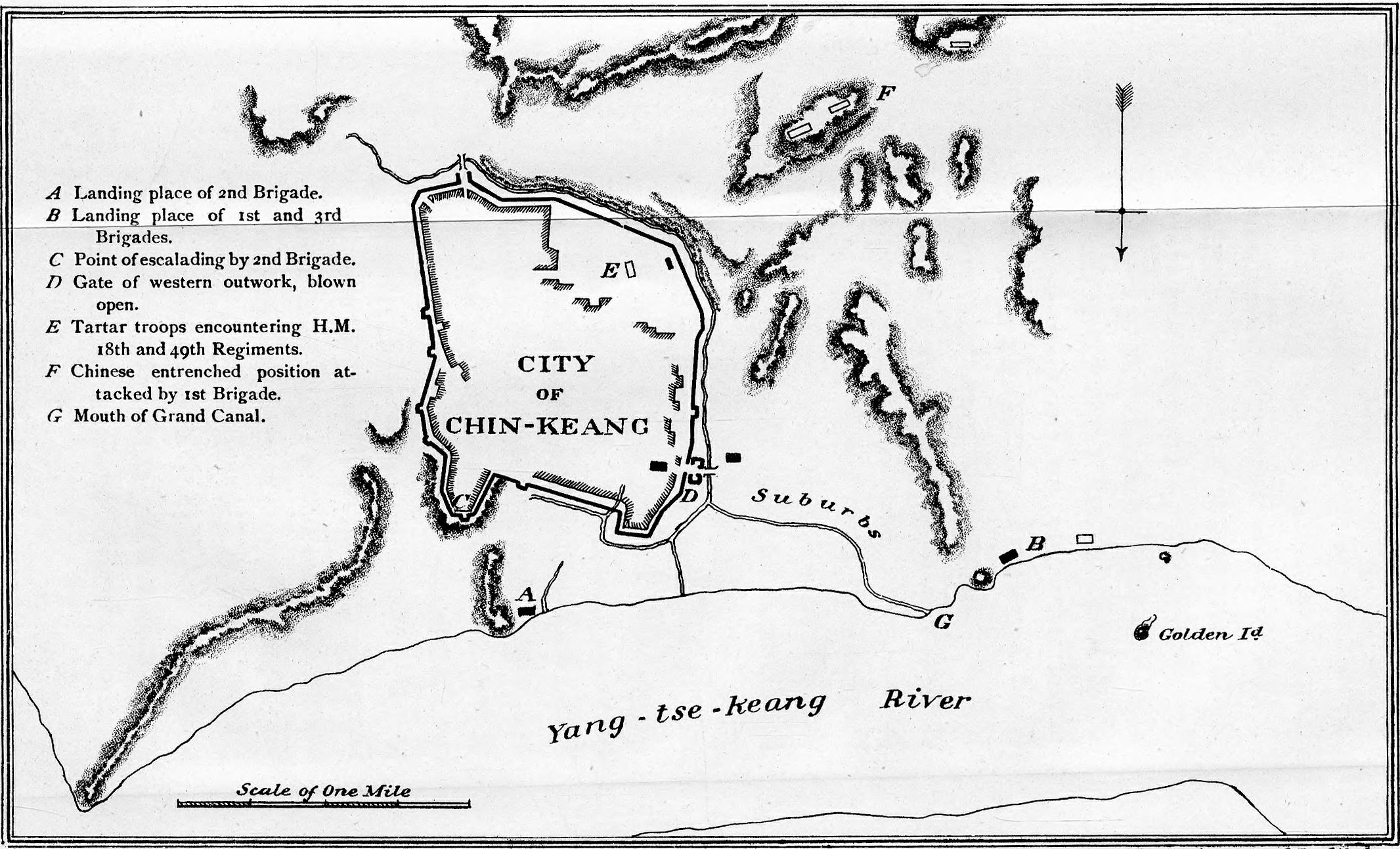
Map of the battle

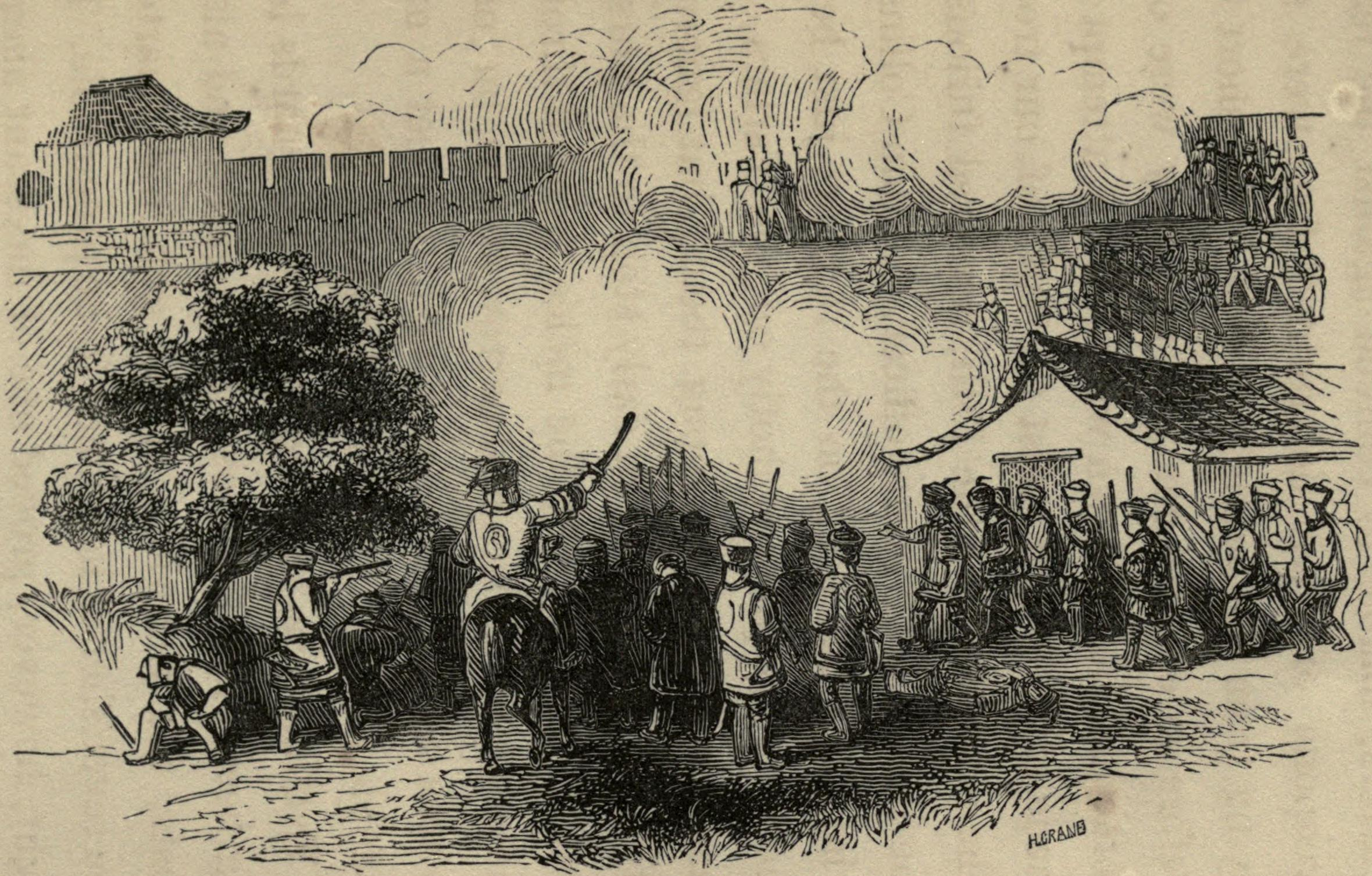
Rallying of the Tartar troops

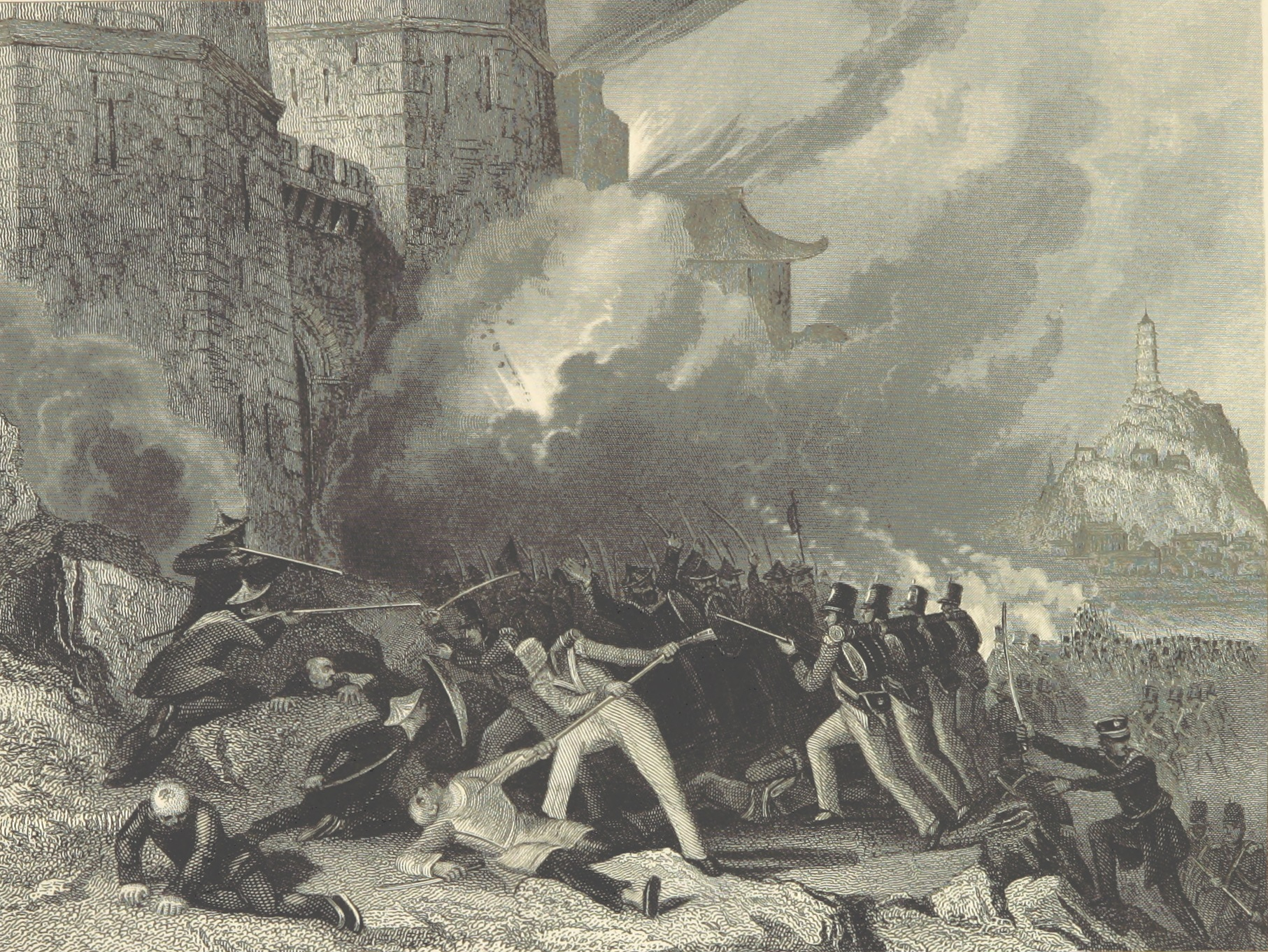
Engagement in Zhenjiang

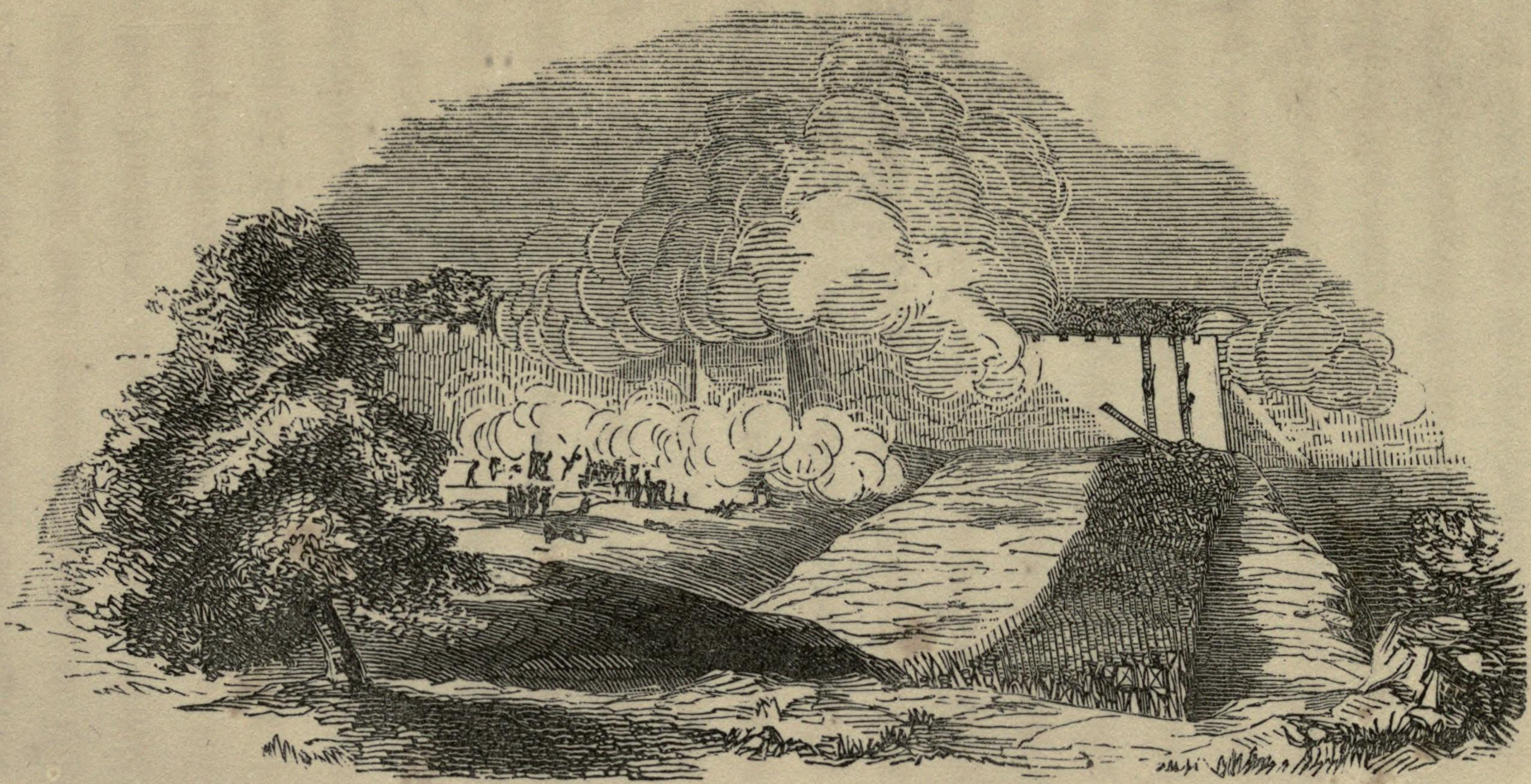
Escalade in Zhenjiang

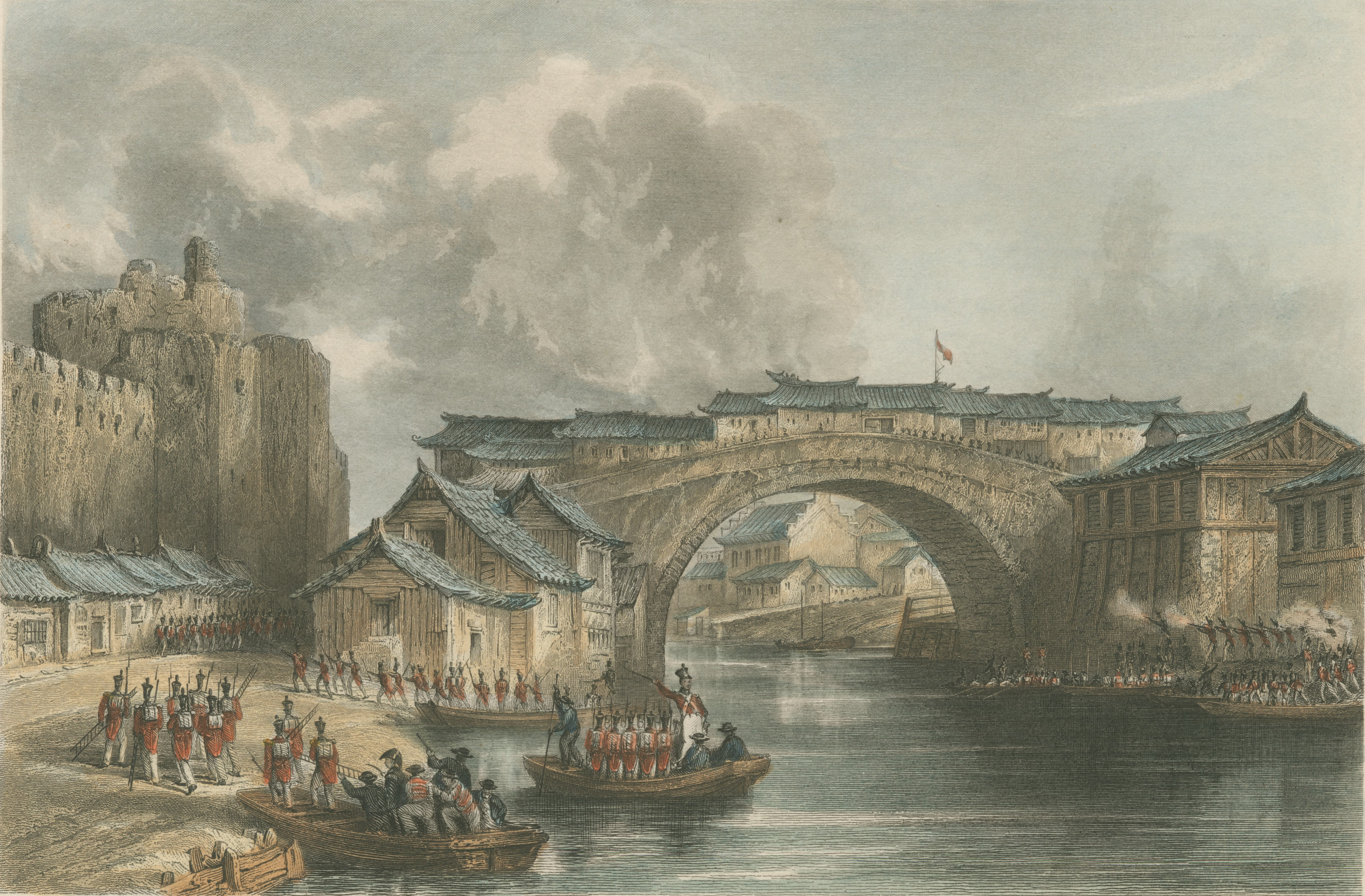
West gate of Zhenjiang, 21 July 1842. Artist: Thomas Allom, after Lt James Stoddart, RN, HMS Cornwallis

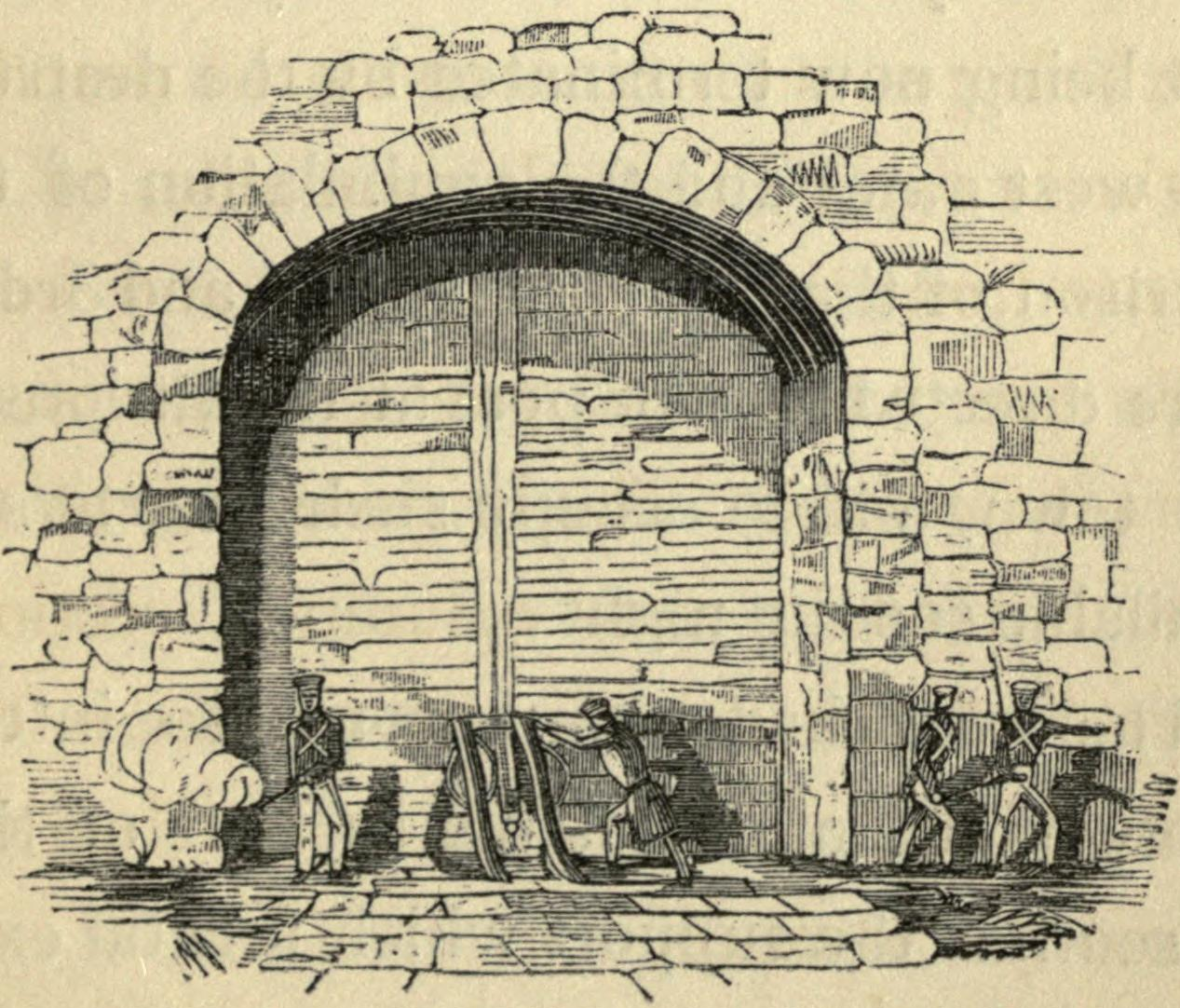
Blowing open the gates of the city

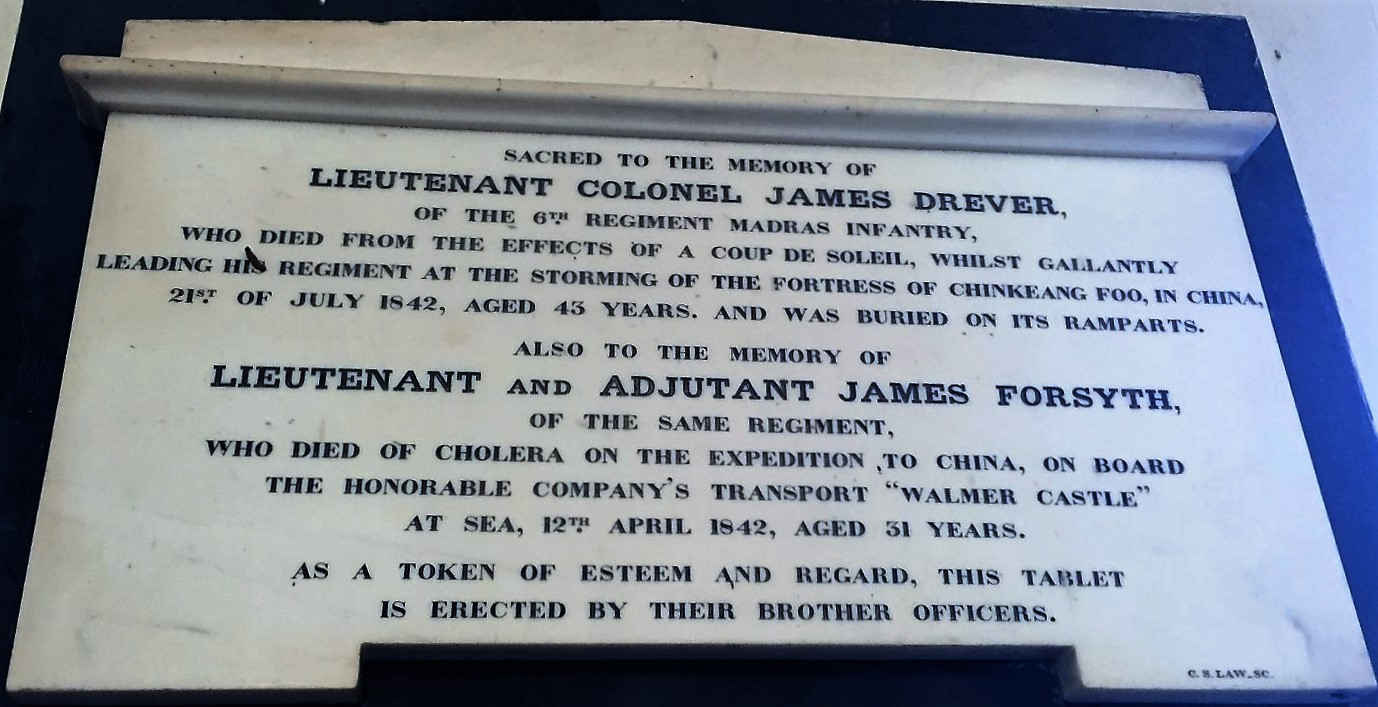
Battle memorial at St. George's Cathedral, Madras
