= John Henry Foley =

Irish sculptor (1818–1874)

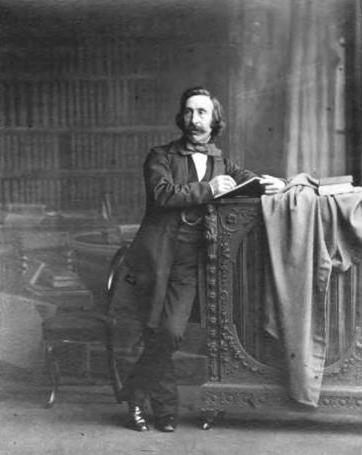
- John Henry Foley in 1863, by Ernest Edwards
- Born: 24 May 1818; Dublin, Ireland
- Died: 27 August 1874 (aged 56); Hampstead, London
- Resting place: St. Paul's Cathedral, London
- Education: Royal Dublin Society art schools, (1831-34); Royal Academy Schools, (1835-38)
- Known for: Sculpture

John Henry Foley RA (24 May 1818 – 27 August 1874), often referred to as J. H. Foley, was an Irish sculptor, working in London. He is best known for his statues of Daniel O'Connell for the O'Connell Monument in Dublin, and of Prince Albert for the Albert Memorial in London and for a number of works in India.

While much contemporary Victorian sculpture was considered lacking in quality and vision, Foley's work was often regarded as exceptional for its technical excellence and life-like qualities. He was considered the finest equestrian sculptor of the Victorian era. His equestrian statue of Henry Hardinge, 1st Viscount Hardinge for Kolkata was considered, with its dynamic pose of horse and rider, to be the most important equestrian statue cast in Britain at the time. His 1874 equestrian statue of Sir James Outram, 1st Baronet for Kolkata was also widely praised and, like the Hardinge statue, was also considered an important symbol of British imperial rule in India. Foley's pupil Thomas Brock completed several of Foley's commissions after his death, including the statue of Prince Albert for the Albert Memorial.

== Biography ==
=== Early life ===
Foley was born 24 May 1818, at 6 Montgomery Street, Dublin, in what was then the city's artists' quarter. The street has since been renamed Foley Street in his honour. His father was a grocer and his step-grandfather Benjamin Schrowder was a sculptor. At the age of thirteen, he followed his brother Edward to begin studying drawing and modelling at the Royal Dublin Society school, where he took several first-class prizes. In 1835 he was admitted to the Royal Academy Schools in London, where he won a silver medal for sculpture. Both brothers served as studio assistants to the sculptor William Behnes. Foley exhibited at the Royal Academy for the first time in 1839. Foley's first significant commission came in 1840 with a sculpture group, Ino and Bacchus for Lord Ellesmere. Youth at a Stream exhibited in 1844 brought greater recognition and the same year he received two commissions from the Palace of Westminster for statues of John Hampden and John Selden. Thereafter commissions provided a steady career for the rest of his life.

=== Early career and recognition ===
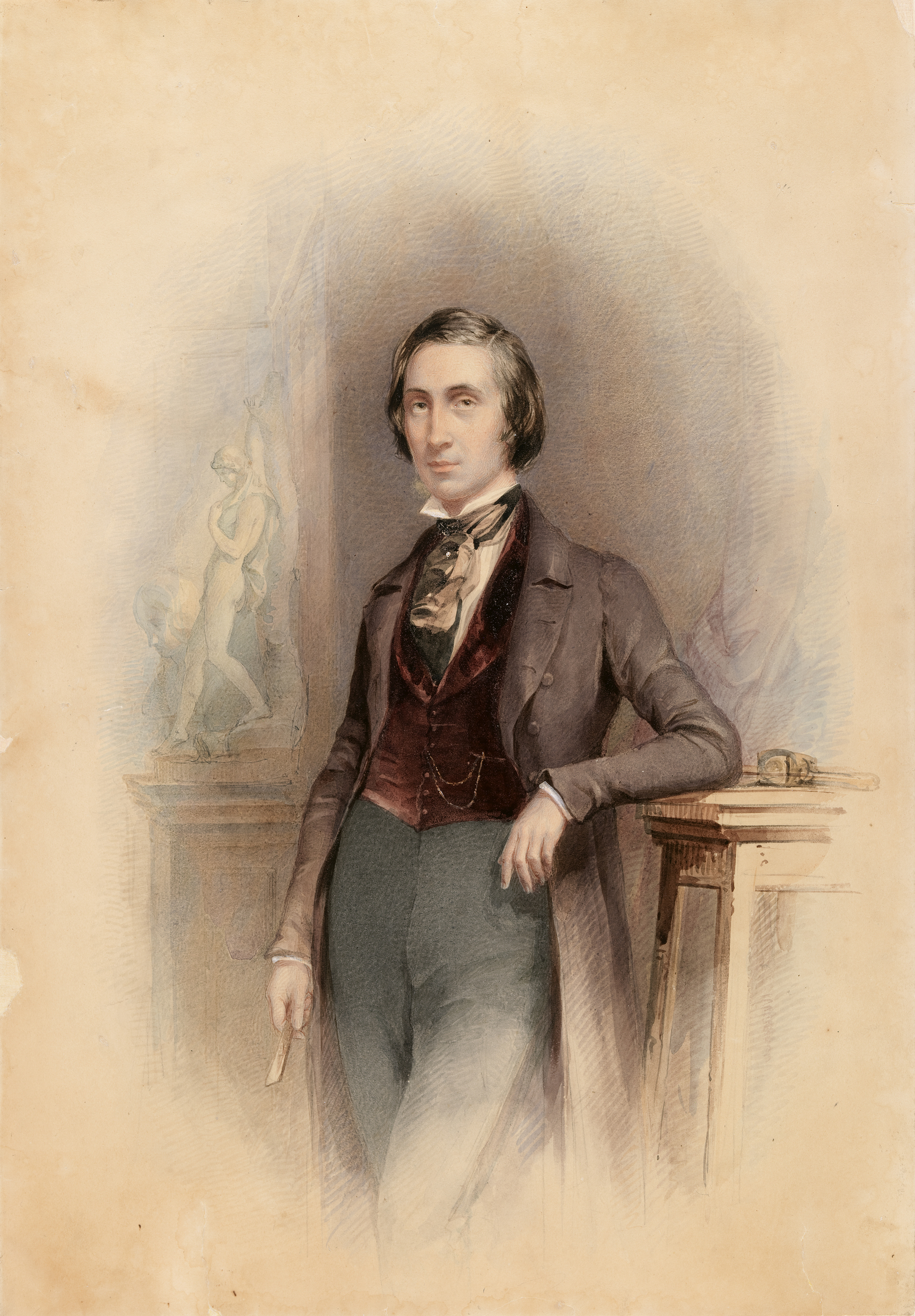
Foley by C. F. Foley, 1840s

In 1849 Foley was made an associate, and in 1858 a full member of the Royal Academy of Art. He exhibited at the Royal Academy until 1861 and further works were shown posthumously in 1875. His address is given in the catalogues as 57 George St., Euston Square, London until 1845, and 19 Osnaburgh Street from 1847. Foley became a member of the Royal Hibernian Academy in 1861 and an associate of the Belgium Academy of Arts in 1863.

A number of works by Foley featured in the Great Exhibition of 1851, including the marble Ino and Bacchus and a bronze casting of a Youth at a Stream. After the Great Exhibition closed, the Corporation of London voted a sum of £10,000 to be spent on sculpture to decorate the Egyptian Hall in the Mansion House and commissioned Foley to make sculptures of Caractacus and Egeria. In 1854, Foley submitted a design for the proposed monument to the Duke of Wellington to be sited in St Paul's Cathedral which was rejected. Foley's sculpture bronze The Norseman was exhibited at the Royal Academy in 1863 to considerable acclaim and represented a departure from the more traditional sculpture style of his contemporaries. The art critic Edmund Gosse viewed Foley as having smoothed the ground for the development of the New Sculpture movement in British art.

=== Equestrian works ===
Foley received three commissions for large equestrian sculptures of individuals who played prominent roles during the period of British rule in India.

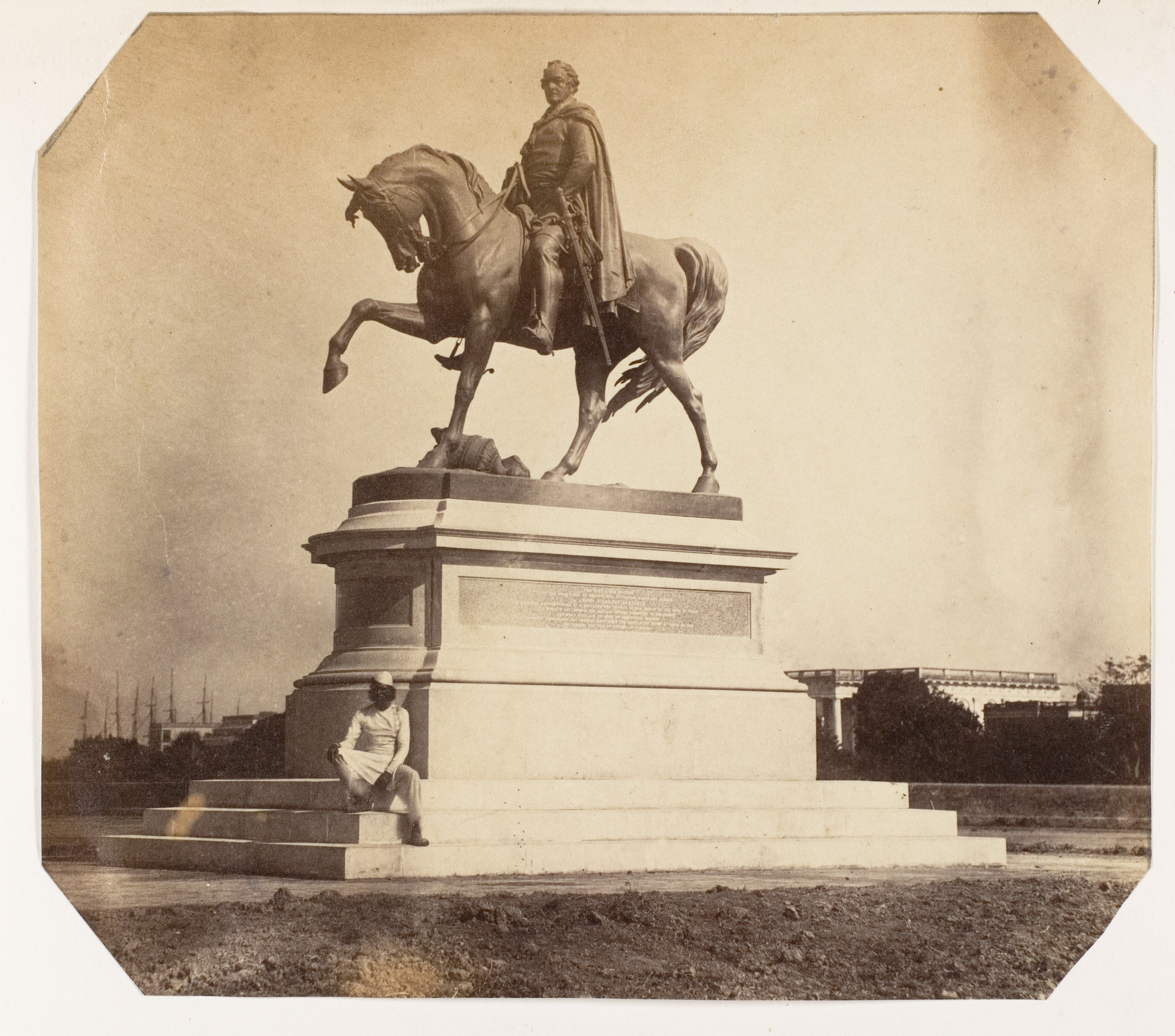
Statue of Lord Hardinge, Governor General of India

The Art Journal hailed Foley's equestrian statue of Henry Hardinge, 1st Viscount Hardinge as a "masterpiece of art" and "a triumph of British art". William Michael Rossetti declared it to be "markedly at the head of British equestrian statues of any period". Completed in 1857, the statue was the first large equestrian statue not to be conventionally cast but to be created by electroforming, building up layers of metal for each piece of the statue which were then joined together by electroplating. The statue, which showed Hardinge's horse trampling a broken Sikh artillery piece, was exhibited outside the Royal Academy in London before it was shipped to Kolkata where it was erected at Shaheed Minar near Government House in 1859. The statue was regarded as the most important equestrian statue to be created in Britain during the Victorian era and a bronzed plaster version was displayed at the London International Exhibition of 1862. When in 1962, the Kolkata local authorities began removing British imperial monuments, the statue was returned to Britain. Purchased for £35 by Baroness Helen Hardinge, the statue was erected at her home in Kent before, in 1985, it was relocated to the private garden of another Hardinge descendent near Cambridge.

Foley's equestrian statue of Sir James Outram, 1st Baronet was regarded as "one of the most magnificent British sculptures in India." Commissioned in 1861, the statue was cast in London from eleven tons of gunmetal seized by the British during the Indian Rebellion of 1857. Foley depicted Outram in a dynamic pose, turning in his saddle to look backwards while pulling up his horse and he considered it his best equestrian work. The statue was unveiled in May 1874 on the Maidan in central Kolkata on a plinth of Cornish granite. For the Calcutta International Exhibition of 1883-84, the entrance to the exhibition was built around the statue. In the 1960s the statue was moved to the grounds of the Victoria Memorial.

By the time he died, Foley had completed an 18-inch tall model of Charles Canning, 1st Earl Canning on horseback. Both horse and rider were depicted in rigid, motionless poses. All the subsequent work on the commission including the full-size modelling, overseeing of the casting and shipping to India and the design of the plinth were completed by Thomas Brock. The statue was originally unveiled at a central location in Barrackpore but was moved in 1969 to a more remote location, a former British military compound where it was placed on a brick base and sited overlooking the grave of Lady Canning.

=== Albert Memorial ===
In 1864, Foley was chosen to sculpt one of the four large stone groups, each representing a continent, at the corners of George Gilbert Scott's Albert Memorial in Kensington Gardens. His design for Asia was approved in December of that year. Foley's Asia, like the other three continental groups, featured a central large animal, in this case an elephant, attended by figures representing different cultures. In 1868, Foley was also asked to make the bronze statue of Prince Albert to be placed at the centre of the memorial, following the death of Carlo Marochetti, who had originally received the commission, but had struggled to produce an acceptable version. By 1870, Foley's full-sized model of Albert was complete and had been accepted. However a series of illnesses slowed Foley's progress and by 1873 only the head of the statue had been cast in bronze while hundreds of other parts were still individual plaster figures. Foley died of pleurisy in 1874, blamed by some on the extended periods he had spent working surrounded by the wet clay of the Asia model. When Foley died, his student Thomas Brock took over his studio and his first job was to complete the figure of Albert which he did within eighteen months. By then, the Albert Memorial had already been unveiled without the statue of Albert. After the statue of Albert was installed on the monument, it was, briefly, inspected by Queen Victoria in March 1876 before being boarded up for gilding. That original gilding was removed in 1915 but restored in the 2000s.

Foley died at his home "The Priory" in Hampstead, north London on 27 August 1874, and was buried in the crypt of St. Paul's Cathedral on 4 September. He left his models to the Royal Dublin Society, where he had his early artistic education, and a large part of his property to the Artists' Benevolent Fund. SC Hall, the editor of The Art Journal, described Foley as being "pensive almost to melancholy.. He was not robust, either in body or in mind; all his sentiments and sensations were graceful: so in truth were his manners. His leisure was consumed by thought." A statue of Foley, on the front of the Victoria and Albert Museum, depicts him as a rather gaunt figure with a moustache, wearing a floppy cap.

== Legacy ==
As well as the statue of Prince Albert for the Albert Memorial, Thomas Brock completed several more of Foley's commissions. A statue of Queen Victoria for the Birmingham Council House was commissioned in 1871 from Foley and completed in 1883 by Thomas Woolner. Foley's articled pupil and later studio assistant Francis John Williamson also became a successful sculptor in his own right, reputed to have been Queen Victoria's favourite. Other pupils and assistants were Charles Bell Birch, Mary Grant and Albert Bruce Joy.

Following the creation of the Irish Free State in 1922, a number of Foley's works were removed, or destroyed, as the individuals portrayed were considered hostile to Irish independence. They included those of Lord Carlisle, Lord Dunkellin (in Galway) and Field Marshal Gough in Phoenix Park. The statue of Lord Dunkellin was decapitated and dumped in the river as one of the first acts of the short-lived "Galway Soviet" of 1922.

== Selected public works ==
=== 1839-1849 ===
Image	Title / subject	Location and coordinates	Date	Type	Material	Dimensions	Designation	Wikidata	Notes
	Catherine Jane Prendergast (1811-1839)	St. Mary's Church, Chennai	1839	Bas-relief	Marble				
	John Hampden	St Stephen's Hall, Palace of Westminster	1847	Statue on pedestal	Marble				
	William Stokes	Royal College of Physicians of Ireland, Dublin	1849	Statue on pedestal	Marble				A former president of the Royal College of Physicians of Ireland

=== 1850-1859 ===
Image	Title / subject	Location and coordinates	Date	Type	Material	Dimensions	Designation	Wikidata	Notes
More images	Hermaphroditus or A Youth at a Stream	Bancroft Gardens, Stratford-upon-Avon	1851	Statue	Bronze				Cast in bronze by J. Hadfield for The Great Exhibition of 1851.
	John Selden	St Stephen's Hall, Palace of Westminster	1853	Statue on pedestal	Marble				
More images	Henry Hardinge, 1st Viscount Hardinge	Shaheed Minar, Kolkata	1857, erected 1859	Equestrian statue on pedestal	Bronze	5.7m statue on 6m pedestal	Grade II listing		Removed from Kolkata and set up on a Hardinge family property at Penshurst, Kent. It was later relocated to the garden of a house in Over, Cambridgeshire.

=== 1860-1864 ===
Image	Title / subject	Location and coordinates	Date	Type	Material	Dimensions	Designation	Wikidata	Notes
More images	John Nicholson	Lisburn Cathedral	1862	Relief	Marble				
	Charles Barry	Palace of Westminster, London	1863	Seated statue					
	John Elphinstone, 13th Lord Elphinstone	The Asiatic Society of Mumbai	1864	Statue on plinth	Marble				
More images	Oliver Goldsmith	Trinity College, Dublin	1864	Statue on pedestal	Bronze				
More images	Father Theobald Mathew	St. Patrick's Street, Cork	1864	Statue on pedestal	Bronze			Q55027847	
More images	Charles John, Earl Canning	Westminster Abbey	After 1862	Statue on pedestal	Marble				
More images	Asia	Albert Memorial, London	1864	Sculpture group	Stone		Grade I listed	Q120199176	
	Nusserwanji Maneckji Petit (1827-91)	Gowalia Tank, Mumbai	1865	Statue on pedestal	Marble				Pedestal by Paolo Triscornia of Carrara

=== 1865-1869 ===
Image	Title / subject	Location and coordinates	Date	Type	Material	Dimensions	Designation	Wikidata	Notes
	Sir Henry Marsh, 1st Baronet	Royal College of Physicians of Ireland, Dublin	1866	Statue	Marble				
	John Sheepshanks	Victoria & Albert Museum	1866	Bust	Marble	78.7cm tall			
More images	O'Connell Monument	O'Connell Street, Dublin	1864, unveiled 1882	Statue on pedestal with supporting figures	Bronze and stone	11.7m tall		Q33123185	
	Albert, Prince Consort	Birmingham Council House	1866	Statue on pedestal	Carrara marble	Statue 230cm, pedestal 93cm			
More images	Colin Campbell, 1st Baron Clyde	George Square, Glasgow	1867	Statue on pedestal	Bronze and granite		Category B	Q17792870	
More images	Statue of Sidney Herbert, 1st Baron Herbert of Lea	Waterloo Place, London	1867	Statue on pedestal	Bronze		Grade II	Q25311606	First unveiled n Pall Mall. Moved to the War Office, Whitehall, in 1906. In 1915 it was moved to Waterloo Place.
More images	Albert, Prince Consort	Leinster House, Dublin	1868	Statue on pedestal with supporting figures	Bronze				
More images	Edmund Burke	Trinity College Dublin	1868	Statue on pedestal	Bronze and stone				
	John Fielden	Centre Vale Park, Todmorden	Designed 1863, erected 1869	Statue on pedestal	Bronze and granite		Grade II		
	Sir Dominic Corrigan	Royal College of Physicians of Ireland, Dublin	1869	Statue	Marble				

=== 1870-1874 ===
Image	Title / subject	Location and coordinates	Date	Type	Material	Dimensions	Designation	Wikidata	Notes
	Lord Carlisle	Phoenix Park, Dublin	1870	Statue on pedestal					Statue removed 1956
	Charles Canning, 1st Earl Canning	Barrackpore, India	1874	Equestrian statue	Bronze				Completed posthumously from Foley's model by Thomas Brock
More images	Sir James Outram, 1st Baronet	Maidan, Kolkata	1874	Equestrian statue on pedestal	Bronze and Cornish granite			Q92360193	Relocated to the gardens of the Victoria Memorial, Kolkata
More images	Sir Benjamin Lee Guinness	Grounds of St Patrick's Cathedral, Dublin	1875	Seated statue on pedestal	Bronze and stone				
More images	Stonewall Jackson	Capitol Square, Richmond, Virginia	Unveiled 1875	Statue on pedestal	Bronze and stone				
More images	Albert, Prince Consort	Albert Memorial, London	Installed 1876	Seated statue	Gilded bronze	4.2m tall statue	Grade I	Q120199176	Completed by Thomas Brock
More images	Henry Grattan	College Green, Dublin	1876	Statue on pedestal	Bronze				Model shown in Dublin in 1872; statue inaugurated January 1876.
More images	Michael Faraday	Royal Institution, London	1876	Statue	Marble			Q120448320	The statue was completed by Thomas Brock after Foley's death and installed in 1876.
	Robert James Graves	Royal College of Physicians of Ireland, Dublin	1877	Statue	Marble				Completed by Albert Bruce Joy after Foley's death
More images	William Rathbone V	Sefton Park, Liverpool	1877	Statue on pedestal with relief panels	Portland stone		Grade II	Q2633129	Statue by Foley, relief panels by Brock
More images	Monument to Hugh Gough, 1st Viscount Gough	Chillingham Castle, Northumberland	1878	Equestrian statue on pedestal	Bronze	24 feet high			Previously in Phoenix Park, Dublin
More images	Michael Faraday	Savoy Place, London	1989	Statue	Bronze			Q27154696	Bronze copy of Foley's 1876 marble statue of Faraday in the Royal Institution.

=== Other works ===
- Memorial to Sir Henry Lawrence, 1858, in St. Paul's Cathedral, Kolkata consisting of a marble relief portrait in a gothic frame.
- Memorial to William Ritchie, 1865, in St. Paul's Cathedral, Kolkata consisting of a marble bust portrait supported by two figures representing Justice and Truth.
- Bust of Major-General William Nairn Forbes, 1858, marble version in the former Silver Mint building on Strand Road, Kolkata and painted plaster model held by the Asiatic Society, Kolkata.
- Egeria (1856) and Caractacus (1857), for the Mansion House, London. Bury Art Museum also has a version of Egeria.
- The Elder Brother from Comus (1860), Foley's Royal Academy diploma work.
- The Muse of Painting (1866), a monument to James Ward, R.A. at Kensal Green Cemetery.
- Sir Joshua Reynolds, 2m tall marble statue, Tate Gallery collection.
- Marble relief portrait of William Hookham Carpenter, 51.3 cm square, in the British Museum.
- Ulick de Burgh, Lord Dunkellin (1873), Eyre Square, Galway
- Statue in memory of George Howard , the 7th Earl of Carlisle. Moat Hill, Brampton Cumbria 1869 (another version in Dublin was blown up by IRA 1956)
- Memorial to the lawyer James Stuart (1854) for Colombo, Sri Lanka
- The National Portrait Gallery, London holds two portrait busts, both in marble, of the poet Bryan Procter and of the actress Helena Faucit by Foley

== See also ==
- List of public art in the City of London
- List of public art in Dublin
- List of public art in Cork
