= Gough =

Gough (/ɡɒf/ GOF) is a surname. The surname may derive from the Welsh coch (English: "red"), possibly given as a nickname to someone with red hair or a red complexion. Another possible derivation is that it was a reduced form of the Irish McGough which itself is an Anglicized form of Gaelic Mag Eochadha, a patronymic from the personal name Eochaidh (variant Eachaidh), "horseman", both derivatives of Irish each "horse".

Notable people with the surname include:

- Alfred Gough, American screenwriter and producer, co-creator of Smallville
- Annette Gough (born 1950), Australian academic
- Antony Gough, New Zealand businessman and property developer
- Austin Gough, American football player
- Bobby Gough (born 1949), English footballer
- Charles Gough (disambiguation)
- Frederick Gough (MP for Horsham) (1901–1977), British Territorial Army officer, company director and politician
- Charles John Stanley Gough, British soldier and recipient of the Victoria Cross
- Darren Gough (born 1970), English cricketer and ballroom dancer
- Denise Gough (born 1980), Irish actress
- Doris Boyd (1888–1960), née Gough, Australian artist
- Douglas Gough (born 1941), British astronomer
- Flori Gough Shorr (1905–1992), née Gough, American cellist
- Frank Gough (1898–1980), Australian cricketer
- Frederick Foster Gough, British Protestant Christian missionary
- George Gough, 2nd Viscount Gough (1815–1895)
- Harold Eric Gough (1921–2008) English historian, writer, lecturer, museum curator and librarian
- Henry Gough (1649–1724), Sheriff of Staffordshire and Member of Parliament
- Hubert Gough (1870–1963), British First World War general
- Hugh Gough (disambiguation)
- Ian Gough, Welsh rugby player
- John Gough (disambiguation)
- Laurie Gough, Canadian-American travel writer
- Martyn Gough (born 1966), British Anglican priest and military chaplain
- Michael Gough (disambiguation)
- Ray Gough (1938–2018), Northern Irish footballer
- Richard Gough (disambiguation)
- Robert Gough (actor), English actor
- Robert Gough (priest), Irish Anglican priest
- Sandra Gough, English actress
- Shane Gough, 5th Viscount Gough (1941–2023)
- Stephen Gough (disambiguation)

== See also ==
- General Gough (disambiguation)
- Gough-Calthorpe family
