= Hugh Gough =

Hugh Gough may refer to:

- Hugh Gough, 1st Viscount Gough (1779–1869), British Army field marshal
- Hugh Gough, 3rd Viscount Gough (1849–1919)
- Hugh Gough, 4th Viscount Gough (1892–1952)
- Hugh Gough (Indian Army officer) (1833–1909), British general awarded the Victoria Cross
- Hugh Gough (bishop) (1905–1997), 7th Archbishop of Sydney, 1959–1966
- Hugh Gough (harpsichord maker) (1916–1997), English-American harpsichord maker
- Hugh Roumieu Gough (1843–1904), British architect
- Hugh Sutlej Gough (1848–1920), British Army major-general and Lieutenant Governor of Jersey
