= McGough =

McGough is an Irish surname that originated in Westmeath

The McGoughs, according to tradition, are a Milesian people, descended from Colla-da-Chrioch, the first king of Orghilla or Oriel. The kingdom of Oriel encompassed the land from County Donegal to County Louth. Oriel is almost synonymous with Ulster. Colla-da-Chrioch, a southern conqueror of Ulster, was one of the three Collas. The identity of the folks who lived in Oriel is shrouded in mystery and disagreement among historians. Historians who give credence to their existence, generally place Colla-da-Chrioch's conquest of Ulster in 331 AD. Some disagree placing it anywhere in the succeeding 100 years. Some scholars feel that the three Collas never existed. The McCanns (Old Gaelic, Mac Cana) are said to have descended from Breasail, a grandson of Colla-da-Chrioch.

There is almost unanimity in the opinion that Eochaidh is derived from the Gaelic word for horse, eoch or each. Some doubt has been expressed, however, based on the assumption that the only proper Gaelic form of the word for horse is ech:

Keogh, for instance, is widely known. It is Mac Eochadha, that is 'Eochaidh's Son.' Eochaidh is an extremely widely used name in Old Irish texts, it is the name of several gods and mythical quasi-divine kings. But what does Eochaid (OI spelling) mean? Some take it as equivalent to Echaid (from 'ech', 'horse') therefore 'Horseman'. Not improbable because of place of horse in ancient Celtic religion. But why -o- in Eochaid? Many words eo—'salmon', 'point', 'pin,' 'yew' and others, but then whence -ch- in Eochaid? So, whereas there's no doubt that Keogh is Mac Eochadha (OI Macc Eochada), there's unresolved doubt about Eochaid[h]. – Gaelic Language Bulletin Board of July 31, 1989

Eochaidh is an ancient Irish name. The index to Keating's History of Ireland shows several pages of Eochaidhs. The Index Nominum to O'Donovan's version of the Annals of the Four Masters contains two pages of Eochaidhs. Mac Eocada is usually translated as "horseman", but sometimes "possession of horses". John O'Hart says that Eachach means "having many horses". David F. Dale, always an independent and innovative scholar, says Eochaid "derives probably from a phrase which means a 'descendant of the horse' ie Eoch-aidh." The Ancient Origins of the Scots, Part I, 5.6 "Scotic Settlement and the Horse 'Goddess'", by David Dale.

Eochaid mac Ardgar is listed as one of the Kings of Ulidia. Francis John Byrne, in his book Irish Kings and High-Kings (B. T. Batsford London 1973), at page 127, uses the name "Eochaid mac Ardgail king of Ulaid", and says:

In the eleventh century family surnames became common among the royal septs in Ireland. These probably originated in a desire to distinguish the rigdamnai [persons eligible to be king] from remoter relatives. Thus in Ulster not merely the sons and grandsons of Eochaid mac Ardgail, but also his later descendants took the name Mac Eochada or Ua hEochada (MacCaughey, Haughey, Hoey).

The Mac Eochadhas may also have become McGoughs/McGeoughs.

Notable people with the surname include:

- Alex McGough (born 1995), American football player
- David Christopher McGough (1944–2023), English Catholic bishop
- John McGough (athlete) (1876–1967), Scottish athlete
- James Robert McGough Titanic survivor who was a buyer with the firm of Strawbridge & Clothier at the time he boarded as a first class passenger
- John F. McGough, American football player and coach
- Mark McGough (born 1984), Australian rules footballer
- Peter McGough (born 1958), American artist
- Philip McGough, English actor
- Richard McGough (1892–1917), English footballer
- Roger McGough (born 1937), English poet
- Towns McGough, American football player
