= General Gough =

General Gough may refer to:

- Charles John Stanley Gough (1832–1912), British Indian Army general
- Hubert Gough (1870–1963), British Army general
- Hugh Gough, 1st Viscount Gough (1779–1869), British Army general
- Hugh Henry Gough (1833–1909), British Indian Army general
- Hugh Sutlej Gough (1848–1920), British Army major general
- John Gough (British Army officer) (1871–1915), British Army brigadier general
