= John Gough =

John Gough may refer to:

== Sportspeople ==
- John Gough (American football) (1900–1935), American football player and coach
- John Gough (Canadian football) (born 1920s), Canadian football player and triple jumper
- John Gough (footballer), Irish football goalkeeper
- John Gough (referee) (born 1937), Irish Gaelic games match official
- John Gough (sport shooter) (1929–2023), English sport shooter

== Other ==
- John Gough (actor), American actor in the silent film era, including in Wives and Other Wives
- John Gough (British Army officer) (1871–1915), British general and recipient of the Victoria Cross
- John Gough (composer) (1903–1951), Australian-born British composer, radio producer and radio playwright for the BBC
- John Gough (natural philosopher) (1757–1825), English natural and experimental philosopher
- John Bartholomew Gough (1817–1886), American temperance orator
- John George Gough (1848–1907), co-founder of the New South Wales Labour Party
- John Wiedhofft Gough (1900–1976), Welsh historian
