= Viscount Gough =

Viscountcy in the Peerage of the United Kingdom

Viscountcy Gough
- Arms: Quarterly: 1st and 4th, Gules on a Mount Vert a Lion passant guardant Or supporting with his dexter paw the Union Flag flowing to the sinister proper over the same in chief the words "China" and "India" in letters of gold; 2nd and 3rd, Azure on a Fess Argent between three Boars' Heads couped Or a Lion passant Gules in the centre chief point pendent from a Riband Argent fimbriated Azure a representation of the Badge of the Spanish Order of Charles III proper on a Chief within Battlements a Representation of the East Wall of the Fortress of Tarifa with a Breach between two Turrets the dexter Turret surmounted by the British Flag flying all proper
- Creation date: 15 June 1849
- Created by: Queen Victoria
- Peerage: Peerage of the United Kingdom
- First holder: Hugh Gough, 1st Baron Gough
- Last holder: Shane Gough, 5th Viscount Gough
- Subsidiary titles: Baron Gough
- Status: Extinct
- Extinction date: 2023
- Seat: Keppoch House
- Former seats: St. Helen's House; Lough Cutra Castle
- Motto: FAUGH A BALLAGH (Clear the way)

Viscount Gough (/ˈɡɒf/), of Goojerat in the Punjab and of the city of Limerick, was a title in the Peerage of the United Kingdom. It was created in 1849 for the Anglo-Irish military commander Hugh Gough, 1st Baron Gough, whose military successes included the First Opium War, the First Anglo-Sikh War, and the Second Anglo-Sikh War. He had already been created a baronet, of Synone and Drangan, in the Baronetage of the United Kingdom, on 23 December 1842, and Baron Gough, of ChingKangFoo in China and of Maharajpore and the Sutlej in the East Indies, in 1846, also in the Peerage of the United Kingdom. Lord Gough later became a field marshal. The titles became extinct in 2023 following the death of the 5th Viscount.

The family seat was originally established by the 1st Viscount near Gort at Lough Cutra Castle in County Galway, Ireland, when it was purchased by him in 1852. He also resided near Dublin at St. Helen's, Booterstown. The family seat later became Keppoch House near Dingwall in Ross-shire, Scotland.

The name was pronounced "Goff", not "Guff".

== Title holders ==
=== Gough baronets (1842) ===
- Hugh Gough, 1st Baronet (1779–1869) (created Baron Gough in 1846)

=== Baron Gough (1846) ===
- Hugh Gough, 1st Baron Gough (1779–1869) (created Viscount Gough in 1849)

=== Viscount Gough (1849) ===
- Hugh Gough, 1st Viscount Gough, KP, GCSI, KCB, PC (1779–1869), Field Marshal
- George Stephens Gough, 2nd Viscount Gough (1815–1895)
- Hugh Gough, 3rd Viscount Gough, KCVO (1849–1919)
- Hugh William Gough, 4th Viscount Gough, MC (1892–1951)
- Shane Hugh Maryon Gough, 5th Viscount Gough (1941–2023)

== Male-line family tree ==
Male-line family tree, Gough baronets, Barons Gough, and Viscounts Gough

Hugh Gough; 1st Viscount Gough; 1st Baron Gough; 1st Baronet; 1779–1869
Edward Gough; 1810–1813	George Gough; 2nd Viscount Gough; 1815–1895
Hugh Gough; 3rd Viscount Gough; 1849–1919	Col. Hon. George Gough; 1852–1900	Hon. Hugh Gough; 1856–1879
Hugh Gough; 4th Viscount Gough; 1892–1951	Guy Gough; 1887–1959	George Gough; 1889–1936	Harold Gough; 1894–1916	Dermot Gough; 1896–1919
Shane Gough; 5th Viscount Gough; 1941–2023
Titles extinct

== Arms ==
Coat of arms of Viscount Gough
Crest 1st: a Boar's Head couped Or; 2nd: on a Mural Crown Argent a Lion passant guardant Or holding in the dexter paw two Flag Staves in bend sinister proper the one being the Union Flag of Great Britain and Ireland surmounting the other the staff thereof broken with a triangular Banner flowing therefrom to represent a Chinese Flag having thereon a Dragon and in an Escroll above the word "China"; 3rd: a Dexter Arm embowed in Facings of the 87th Regiment (Gules faced Vert) the hand grasping the Colour of the said Regiment displayed and a representation of a French Eagle reversed and depressed the staff broken proper in an Escroll above the word "Barossa". Escutcheon Quarterly: 1st and 4th, Gules on a Mount Vert a Lion passant guardant Or supporting with his dexter paw the Union Flag flowing to the sinister proper over the same in chief the words "China" and "India" in letters of gold; 2nd and 3rd, Azure on a Fess Argent between three Boars' Heads couped Or a Lion passant Gules in the centre chief point pendent from a Riband Argent fimbriated Azure a representation of the Badge of the Spanish Order of Charles III proper on a Chief within Battlements a Representation of the East Wall of the Fortress of Tarifa with a Breach between two Turrets the dexter Turret surmounted by the British Flag flying all proper. Supporters Dexter: a Lion reguardant Or gorged with an Eastern Crown Gules the rim inscribed with the word "Punjab" in letters of gold with Chain reflexed over the back also Gold; Sinister: a Chinese Dragon Or gorged with a Mural Crown Sable inscribed with the word "China" and chained Gold. Motto Above the centre Crest: Faugh a Ballagh (Clear the way); Below the shield: Goojerat.

== Sources ==
- Hesilrige, Arthur G. M. (1921). Debrett's Peerage and Titles of courtesy. 160A, Fleet street, London, UK: Dean & Son. p. 413.
- Kidd, Charles, Williamson, David (editors). Debrett's Peerage and Baronetage (1990 edition). New York: St Martin's Press, 1990,
- Leigh Rayment's Peerage Pages
