= Shane Gough, 5th Viscount Gough =

British hereditary peer (1941–2023)

The Right Honourable The Viscount Gough
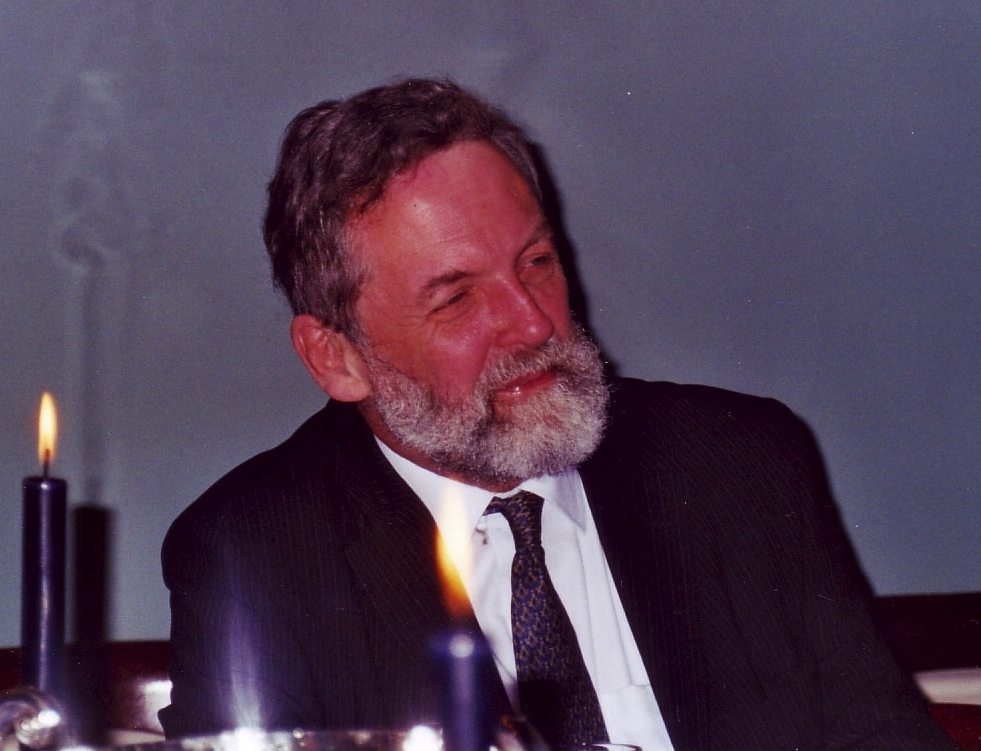
- Lord Gough at the Carlton Club in 2005

Member of the House of Lords
- Lord Temporal
- In office 4 December 1951 – 11 November 1999
- Preceded by: The 4th Viscount Gough
- Succeeded by: Seat abolished

Personal details
- Born: Shane Hugh Maryon Gough; 26 August 1941
- Died: 14 April 2023 (aged 81)
- Political party: Crossbench
- Parents: Hugh Gough, 4th Viscount Gough; Margaretta Maryon-Wilson

Shane Hugh Maryon Gough, 5th Viscount Gough (26 August 1941 – 14 April 2023), was a British hereditary peer. He was educated at Winchester College and Sandhurst. He was the son of Hugh Gough, 4th Viscount Gough, and Margaretta Elizabeth Maryon-Wilson. His father died in 1951 and he succeeded to the viscountcy at the age of ten. Lord Gough resided at the family seat, Keppoch House, near Dingwall, Scotland, but also had a London residence. His employment was in London. He was unmarried, and there was no heir to the peerage or baronetcy.

== Career ==
Gough was educated at Abberley Hall School and Winchester College. He served as an officer in the Irish Guards (Household Division, British Army), following in family tradition. Although he followed his father into the Guards, his most famous military forebear is undoubtedly Field Marshal Hugh Gough, 1st Viscount Gough. After leaving military service he worked as a stockbroker. From 1993 to his death he served as a Director of Barwell Consulting, an investment consultancy based in Glasgow, Scotland.

== Freemasonry ==
Gough was actively involved in English Freemasonry, having been initiated in the Prince of Wales's Lodge No 259 (London) in 1966 and installed as Master of the Lodge of Assistance No 2773 (London) in 1972. He was subsequently Master of Lodge of Assistance for two further terms. He served as Senior Grand Warden of the United Grand Lodge of England in 1984–1985. He was a Grand Steward in both 1974 and 1991, and in 2007 was installed as Master of the Grand Stewards' Lodge. He was also connected with Freemasonry in both Ireland and Scotland.

== Order of Saint Lazarus ==
Gough was Prior of the Grand Bailiwick of Scotland in the Order of Saint Lazarus. The order aims to relieve the suffering of the sick and disadvantaged, with a particular emphasis on charitable support for those working for the relief and cure of leprosy.

== Death ==
Gough died on 14 April 2023, at the age of 81. As he had no issue, nor any male cousins eligible to succeed to his titles, they became extinct upon his death.

== Arms ==
Coat of arms of Shane Gough, 5th Viscount Gough
| Crest 1st: a Boar's Head couped Or; 2nd: on a Mural Crown Argent a Lion passant guardant Or holding in the dexter paw two Flag Staves in bend sinister proper the one being the Union Flag of Great Britain and Ireland surmounting the other the staff thereof broken with a triangular Banner flowing therefrom to represent a Chinese Flag having thereon a Dragon and in an Escroll above the word "China"; 3rd: a Dexter Arm embowed in Facings of the 87th Regiment (Gules faced Vert) the hand grasping the Colour of the said Regiment displayed and a representation of a French Eagle reversed and depressed the staff broken proper in an Escroll above the word "Barossa". Escutcheon Quarterly: 1st and 4th, Gules on a Mount Vert a Lion passant guardant Or supporting with his dexter paw the Union Flag flowing to the sinister proper over the same in chief the words "China" and "India" in letters of gold; 2nd and 3rd, Azure on a Fess Argent between three Boars' Heads couped Or a Lion passant Gules in the centre chief point pendent from a Riband Argent fimbriated Azure a representation of the Badge of the Spanish Order of Charles III proper on a Chief within Battlements a Representation of the East Wall of the Fortress of Tarifa with a Breach between two Turrets the dexter Turret surmounted by the British Flag flying all proper. Supporters Dexter: a Lion reguardant Or gorged with an Eastern Crown Gules the rim inscribed with the word "Punjab" in letters of gold with Chain reflexed over the back also Gold; Sinister: a Chinese Dragon Or gorged with a Mural Crown Sable inscribed with the word "China" and chained Gold. Motto Above the centre Crest: Faugh a Ballagh (Clear the way); Below the shield: Goojerat. |

Peerage of the United Kingdom
| Preceded by Hugh Gough | Viscount Gough; 1951–2023; Member of the House of Lords (1951–1999) | Extinct |
| Preceded by Hugh Gough | Baron Gough; 1951–2023 | Extinct |
Baronetage of the United Kingdom
| Preceded by Hugh Gough | Gough baronets of Synone and Drangan; 1951–2023 | Extinct |
