= Richard Gough (disambiguation) =

Richard Gough (born 1962) is a Scottish former football defender.

Richard Gough may also refer to:

- Richard Gough (Welsh footballer) (1859–1934), Wales international footballer
- Richard Gough (antiquarian) (1735–1809), English antiquarian
- Richard Gough (1635–1723), the author of The History of Myddle
- Richard Gough (1655–1728), British merchant and politician

== See also ==
- Richard McGough (1892–1917), English footballer
