= Cosgrave Property Group =

Irish construction company

- Industry: Real estate, Property developments
- Founded: 1979 in Dublin
- Key people: Joseph Cosgrave, Michael Cosgrave

The Cosgrave Property Group is an Irish property development company established by brothers Joseph, Michael, and Peter Cosgrave. It currently has loans from the National Asset Management Agency.

The group is also known as Cosgrave Developments and is a subsidiary of Borg Developments.

== History ==
The company was established in 1979 by the brothers Joseph, Michael and Peter Cosgrave, sons of Jack Cosgrave, also a notable property developer.

In 2007 the company won the Irish Developer of the Year Award at the award event organised by UK property magazine Property Week.

In 2014 Cosgrave has sold to Green REIT a €384.4 million worth portfolio, comprising office buildings at Georges Quay and George's Court, Dublin 2 and retail and commercial space in Westend Retail Park, Blanchardstown.

In September 2016 the company has announced plans to build a new office building called The Exchange. A€60m million funding was provided by Irish investment fund IPUT. In 2016, the company sold 197 apartments at Neptune, Honeypark to SW3 Capital-Tristan Capital Partners for €72.5m. The following year, the Cosgraves sold 319 apartments at the Leone and Charlotte buildings at Honeypark to Patrizia for €132m.

== Property ==
- Belville, Donnybrook, Dublin, Ireland.
- Morehampton Square, Donnybrook, Dublin, Ireland.
- Donnybrook Manor, Donnybrook, Dublin, Ireland.
- Sweepstakes and Shrewsbury, Ballsbridge, Dublin, Ireland.
- Chesterfield, Castleknock, Dublin, Ireland.
- Custom Hall, Gardiner Street, Dublin, Ireland (1992).
- St. Helen's, Booterstown, Dublin, Ireland. Currently operated as a Radisson Hotel. (1996 IEP£2m)
- Ardilea Wood, Clonskeagh, Dublin, Ireland (2000). Noted as the first development of IEP£1m houses in Ireland.
- The 78 acre former site of the Dun Laoghaire Golf Club on Glenageary Road, Dublin, Ireland. (2002 EUR€20m)
- George's Quay office complex, Dublin, Ireland.
- Caxtongate retail and office complex, Birmingham, United Kingdom. (Bought 2006 GBP£78.8m, Sold 2011 approx. 25% for £16m / €18.23m).
- Liberty shopping centre, Romford, Greater London, United Kingdom, (2006 GBP£281m / EUR€415m).
- 301–307 Oxford Street, London, United Kingdom. (2007 GBP£86.5m / EUR€124m)
- Jubilee House, 197–213 Oxford Street, London, United Kingdom. (Sold 2011 GBP£165m).
- 215–219 Oxford Street, London, United Kingdom. (Sold 2011 GBP£55.1m).
- Cedarview, Northwood, Santry Demesne, Dublin, Ireland
