= John Gough (American football) =

American football player and coach (1900–1935)

Biographical details
- Born: August 29, 1900; Butler County, Iowa, U.S.
- Died: January 19, 1935 (aged 34); Upland, California, U.S.

Coaching career (HC unless noted)
- 1931–1932: Redlands

Head coaching record
- Overall: 11–5–1 (college)

John Benjamin Gough (August 29, 1900 – January 19, 1935) was an American college football player and coach. He served as the head football coach at Redlands University from 1931 to 1932 compiling a record of 11–5–1.

Gough graudared from Upper Iowa University in Fayette, Iowa. He died on January 19, 1935, at San Antonio Community Hospital in Upland, California, from injuries sustained in an automobile accident two weeks prior near Ontario, California.

== Head coaching record ==
=== College ===
Year	Team	Overall	Conference	Standing	Bowl/playoffs
Redlands Bulldogs (Southern California Conference) (1931–1932)
1931	Redlands	4–3–1	3–3–1	T–4th	
1932	Redlands	7–2	5–2	T–2nd	
Redlands:		11–5–1	8–5–1		
Total:		11–5–1			
