= George Gough, 2nd Viscount Gough =

George Stephens Gough, 2nd Viscount Gough DL FLS (18 January 1815 – 31 May 1895) was an Anglo-Irish peer in the peerage of the United Kingdom, with a seat in the House of Lords from 1869.

== Life ==
Gough was the son of Field Marshal Hugh Gough, 1st Viscount Gough, by his marriage to Frances Maria Stephens, a daughter of General Edward Stephens. He was commissioned into the Grenadier Guards, rising to the rank of Captain and retiring from the army in 1850.

He was appointed High Sheriff of Tipperary for 1858. In 1869 he succeeded his father in the viscountcy and moved into his father's house, St. Helen's, Booterstown, where he continued to live until his own death in 1895. He became a fellow of the Linnean Society of London.

He married firstly Sarah-Elizabeth Palliser on 17 October 1841, the daughter of Lieutenant-Colonel Wray Palliser and Mary Challoner of Derrylusken and Coagh, County Wexford, Ireland). He married secondly on 3 June 1846 Jane Arbuthnot (born 22 October 1816 in Edinburgh died 3 February 1892), the daughter of George Arbuthnot, 1st of Elderslie (1772-1843) and Elizabeth (Eliza) Fraser (1792-1834). They had three children:

- Hugh, born 27 August 1849, married in London on 5 October 1889, died 14 October 1919
- Colonel Hon. George Hugh Gough, CB (1852–1900), an officer in the 14th Hussars and later Staff officer; married in 1884 Hilda Eva Moffat (1862–1947), daughter of George Moffatt, MP.
- Hon. Eleanor Laura Jane Gough, born 13 October 1854 at Rathronan, County Tipperary, baptized 21 December 1854, married Robert Algernon Persse (born 1845) at Booterstown, Dublin, on 29 July 1886.

Peerage of the United Kingdom
Preceded by Hugh Gough	Viscount Gough; 1869–1895	Succeeded by Hugh Gough
