= Hugh Gough, 4th Viscount Gough =

Hugh William Gough, 4th Viscount Gough, MC, DL (22 February 1892 – 4 December 1951) was a British soldier and peer. He was educated at Eton College and attended New College, Oxford. He was a brevet major in the Irish Guards when he was wounded. He was awarded the MC in 1914.

On 12 November 1935 he married Margaretta Elizabeth Maryon-Wilson, daughter of Sir Spencer Maryon-Wilson, 11th Baronet. They had one son, Shane Hugh Maryon, born on 26 August 1941.

Peerage of the United Kingdom
Preceded by Hugh Gough	Viscount Gough; 1892–1951	Succeeded by Shane Hugh Maryon Gough
