= Hugh Gough, 3rd Viscount Gough =

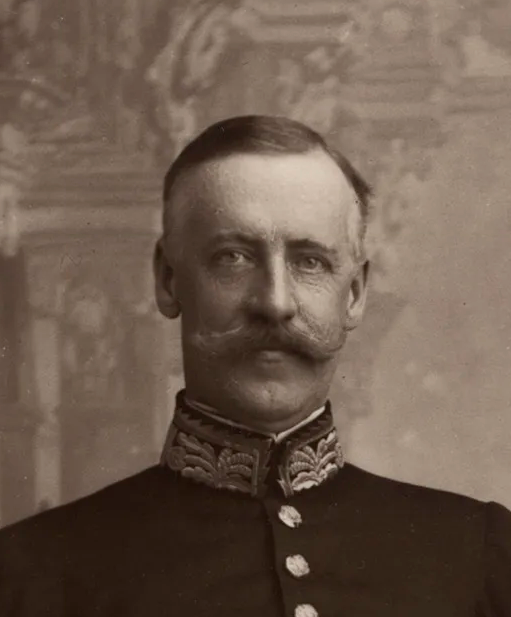
Photograph by Alexander Bassano, 1896

Hugh Gough, 3rd Viscount Gough, KCVO, DL (27 August 1849 – 14 October 1919), he was educated at Brasenose College, Oxford (MA).

In June 1901, Lord Gough was appointed British Minister Resident at the Court of the Kingdom of Saxony and the Duchy of Saxe-Coburg-Gotha, and Chargé d'affaires at the Court of Principality of Waldeck.

On 5 October 1889, he married Lady Georgina Pakenham (1 September 1863 – 30 July 1943), the elder daughter of the 4th Earl of Longford. They had three children:

- Hugh William, born 22 February 1892, married in London on 12 November 1935, died 4 December 1951
- Katherine Nora, born 6 October 1890, married Edward Vyse Sturdy OBE, on 5 April 1910
- Hilda Frances, died in infancy 5 May 1893

Peerage of the United Kingdom
Preceded by George Gough	Viscount Gough; 1895–1919	Succeeded by Hugh Gough
