= J. W. Gough =

Welsh historian

John Wiedhofft Gough (23 February 1900 - 1976) was a Welsh historian noted for his study of John Locke's political philosophy.

== Life and career ==
Gough matriculated at Merton College, Oxford in 1918.

Gough was described as an outstanding student whilst at Oxford, achieving a first in both the classics and modern history, in 1922 and 1923, respectively. He was a Lecturer at the University of Bristol between 1923 and 1931, and during this time spent a year as Visiting Lecturer at Western Reserve University, Ohio. In 1932 he was made a Fellow of Oriel College, Oxford, and in 1947 was appointed lecturer in modern history. He was awarded a DLitt in 1965.

Gough was twice married: firstly in 1926 to Margaret Christian, née Rintoul, with whom he had a son and two daughters; following Margaret's death in 1939, he remarried in 1941, to Margaret Johnston, née Maclagan.

== Works ==
- The Mines of Mendip (1930)
- The Superlative Prodigall, a life of Thomas Bushell (1932)
- The Social Contract: A Critical Study of its Development (Oxford University Press, 1936; 2nd ed., 1957).
- John Locke's Political Philosophy: Eight Studies (Oxford University Press, 1950; 2nd ed., 1973).
- Fundamental Law in English Constitutional History (1955)
