= Stephen Gough (disambiguation) =

Stephen Gough (born 1959) is a British activist known as "The Naked Rambler"

Stephen Gough is also the name of:

- Stephen Gough (footballer) (born 1981), Irish footballer
- Stephen Gough (speed skater) (born 1972), Canadian short track speed skater
- Stephen Gough (politician), Canadian politician
