= St. Helen's, Booterstown =

Period house in Dublin, Ireland

Coordinates: 53.304829°N 6.205613°W

St. Helen's
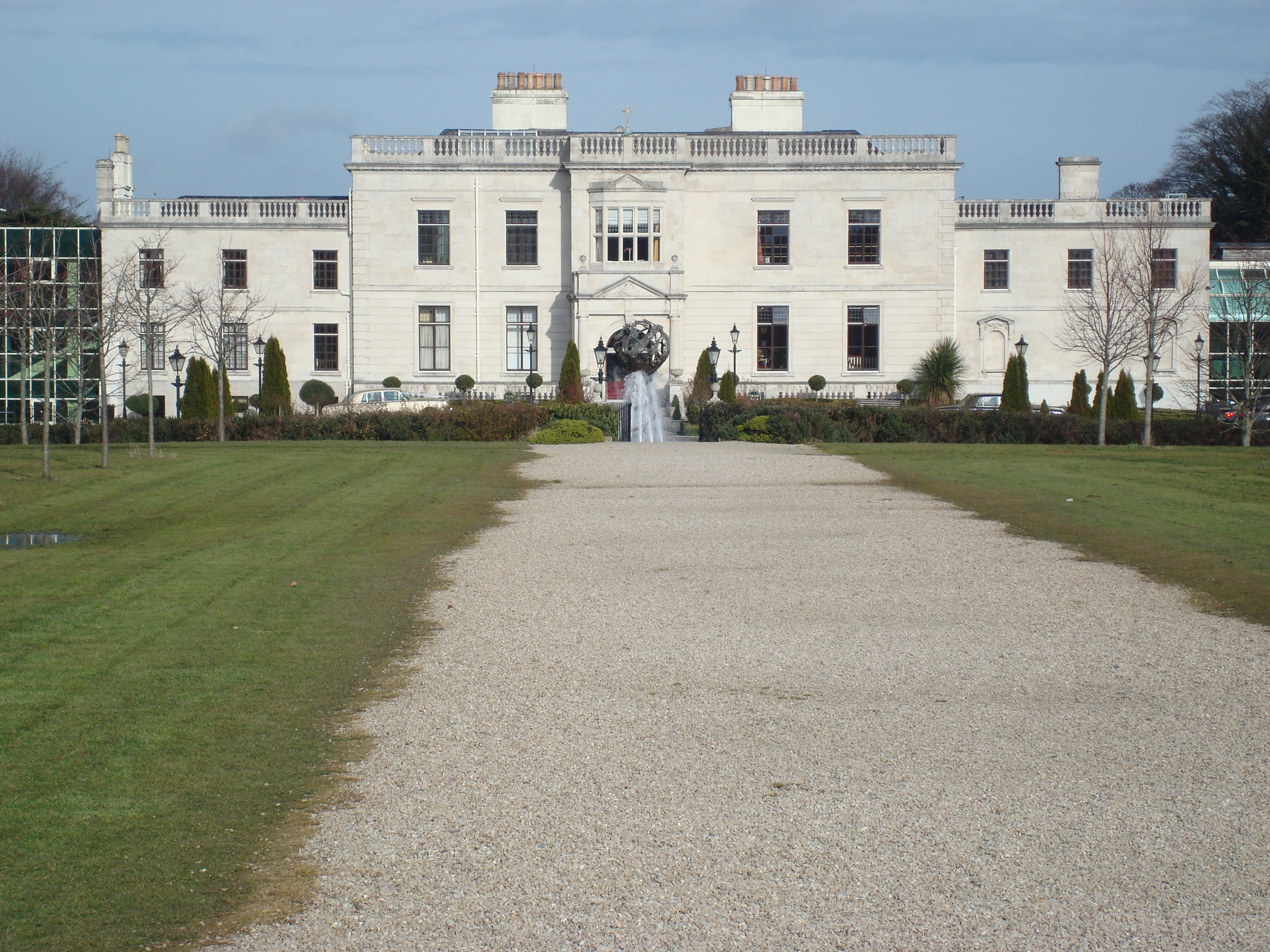
- The house viewed from the south walkway

- Location within Dublin
- Alternative names: Seamount

General information
- Type: House
- Architectural style: Georgian
- Location: Dublin, Ireland
- Current tenants: Scally Hotel Collection
- Completed: 1760
- Owner: Scally Family

Technical details
- Material: Portland stone
- Floor count: 3 over basement

Design and construction
- Developer: Thomas Cooley

Website
- www.sthelenshotel.ie

St. Helen's is a period house built in the early 1750s and located in Booterstown, County Dublin, Ireland. It is operated as a five-star hotel by the Scally Hotel Collection and is owned by the Scally Family. It had some notable owners such as the Hugh Gough, 1st Viscount Gough, Sir John Nutting and the Congregation of Christian Brothers. The building displays the motto "Mors Potior Macula", meaning "Death rather than infamy".

== History ==
The house was originally called Seamount and an entry in the Registry of Deeds shows on 20 June 1754 an agreement between the first owner Thomas Cooley and Richard Viscount Fitzwilliam to let "all that one acre of land plantation entered in and on the west to the high road leading from Dublin to Wicklow". It is understood that Thomas Cooley, noted as being a Dublin barrister and MP of Duleek, was finishing the house and some outbuildings.

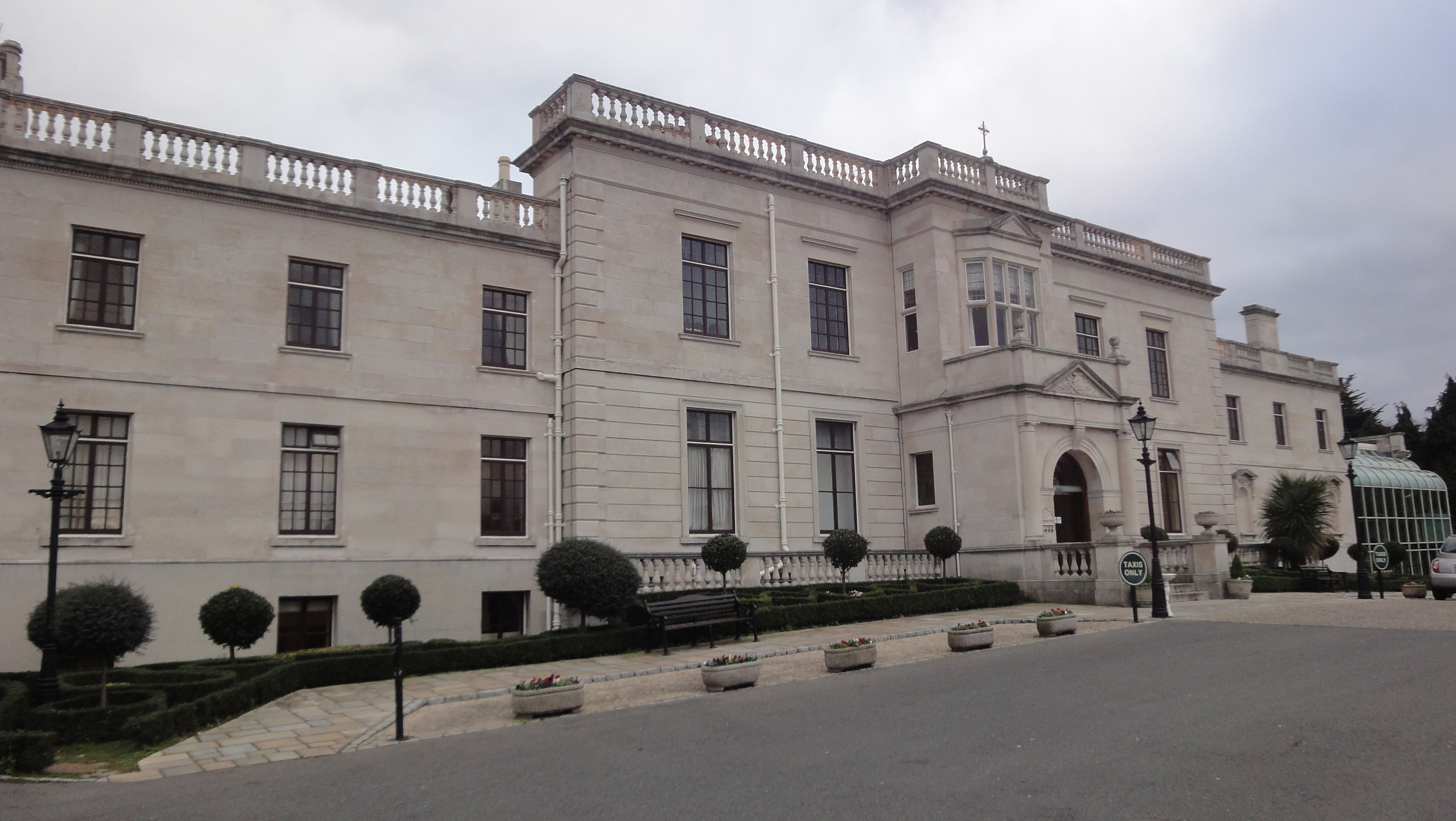
A closer view of St. Helen's house.

The house was sold in 1795 to Robert Alexander, an early patron and churchwarden of St. Philip and St. James Church, Booterstown. He died in 1829.

From 1830 the house was occupied by Right Hon. John Doherty, Chief Justice of the Common Pleas. It was passed to him from a Mrs. Wall (presumably a relative of his wife, Elizabeth Lucy Wall) who purchased it from a representative of Robert Alexander. While he lived there he oversaw some further improvements.

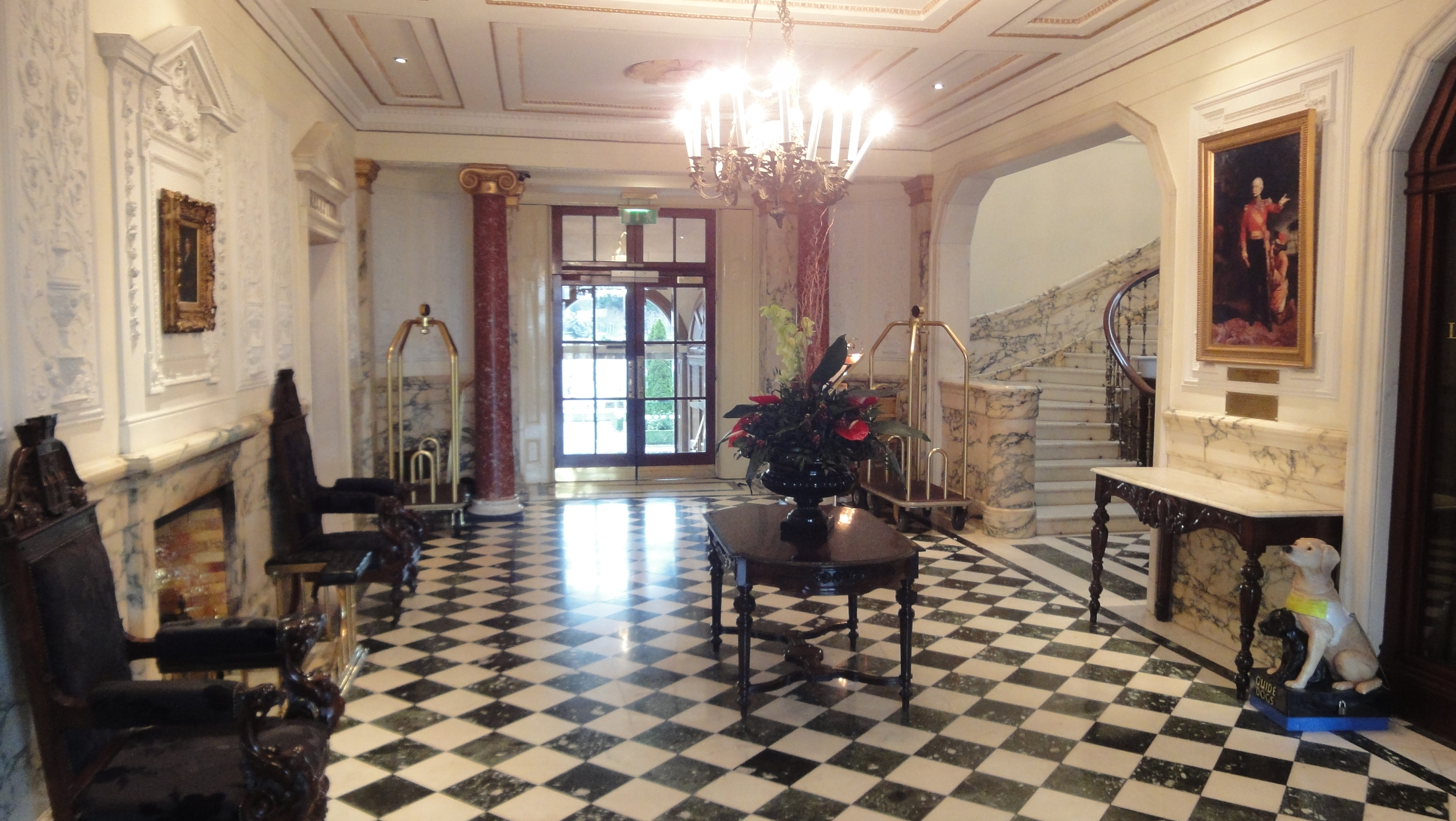
The hallway of the house and looking towards the main entrance.

Colonel Henry White bought the house from John Doherty, and at this time the name of the house changed to St. Helen's. He then sold it in 1851 to Hugh Gough, 1st Viscount Gough.

Hugh Gough became a Baronet in 1842 in recognition of his military services in China. In 1846 while commander in chief of forces in India, he was raised to Baron. He was raised again in 1849 to Viscount Gough due to his achievements during the Sikh rebellion and the annexation of the Punjab. In 1857 he became Knight of St. Patrick.

In 1863, the house was enlarged to the designs of the architect John McCurdy. At another time the architects Carmichael and Jones were brought to work on the house, but they were dismissed for alleged negligence. It is noted in the Valuation Office of 1865–1867 that the property was 56 acres and 6 perches.

Hugh Gough's wife, Frances Maria Gough, died here on 15 March 1863. He died in the house a few years later aged 90 on 2 March 1869.

From 1869, George Gough, 2nd Viscount Gough, occupied the house until his death in 1895. George Gough was a captain in the Grenadier Guards until he retired in 1850 aged 34. George's son sold the house after his father's death.

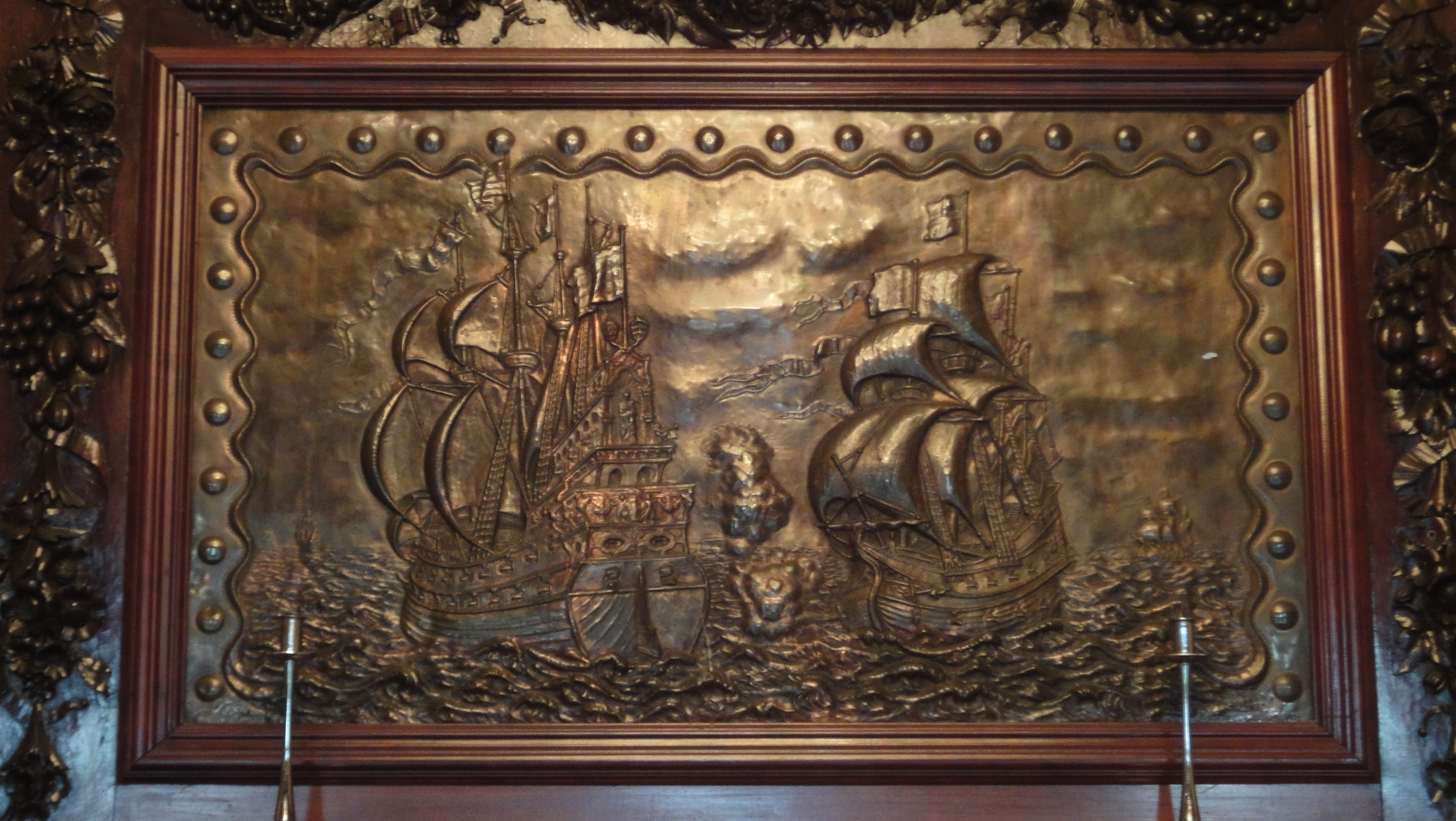
The repoussé copper frieze depicting the Battle of Lepanto.

In 1899, the next owner, Sir John Nutting, improved the house greatly spending thousands of pounds. The facade of the house was faced with Portland stone to harmonise the 18th and 19th century parts of the house. He also remodelled the interior with Italian Carrara marble and decorative plasterwork. A repoussé copper frieze depicting ships and galleons made around 1900 by James Smithies of Manchester, was added to the dining room.

In 1903 Sir John Nutting was given the title of the Nutting Baronetcy of St. Helens. He later died in 1918 and the house was auctioned off.

In 1925 the Christian Brothers bought the house and used it as their headquarters. In 1927 the large ballroom was converted for use as a chapel. In the late 1920s, the Archbishop of Dublin instructed some land to be sold as he felt the church held too much land. The land to the rear west was sold to build the houses of St. Helen's Road, which can be entered from Rock Road.

Around 1968 land to the south was used to build two new Christian Brothers schools, Coláiste Eoin and Coláiste Íosagáin.

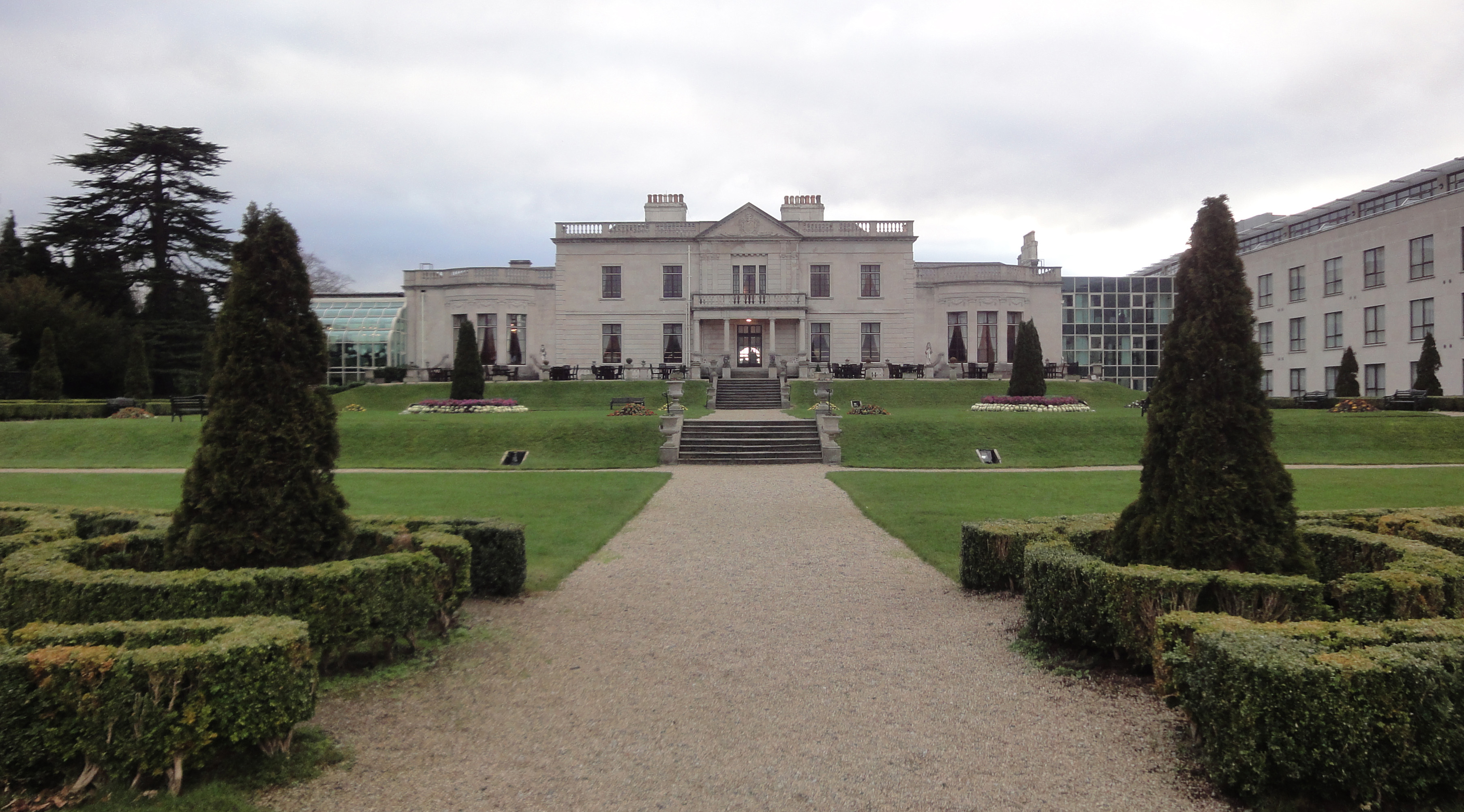
Looking at the house from the rear gardens.

The house and 71 acres were sold in 1988.

In 1990 Seán Dunne's property company, Berland Homes, built the houses of St. Helen's Wood.

The Corporation of Dún Laoghaire bought 9 acres for road reservation with the intention of using it as part of the then proposed Eastern Bypass with the M50 motorway. This would see the road enter from the UCD side of Fosters Avenue and transit through the southwest to the northeast of the property and make its way to the Booterstown marsh.

In 1994 the house was listed as a National Monument.

In 1996 the Cosgrave Property Group bought the house from Berland Homes for £2m to develop it into a hotel.

In 1996 Shannon Homes paid £5.6m for 13.69 acres to the rear northeast of the house and built the Seamount apartments. They were completed for sale in 1998.

The Radisson Hotels became the operator of St. Helen's as a five-star hotel in 1998.

== Preservation ==
In 1994 the house was listed as a National Monument following the demolition of a 19th-century wing sparking fears that a similar fate to Frescati House would occur.

During a presentation for the preservation, Senator Cosgrave noted the house as "one of the finest Georgian houses in the borough and probably one of the finest in the country".

== Gardens ==
Hugh Gough, 1st Viscount Gough, had the seaward gardens laid out in terraces and named them after his various campaigns. The gardens were laid out by Ninian Niven, and by 1870 they were vastly planted with 12,000 plants in the formal gardens. The front of the house was always lined with vases filled with scarlet pelargoniums.

Located in the front gardens is the sculpture called Continuum by Linda Brunker, commissioned by the Cosgrave Property Group and unveiled in 1998.

== Notable residents/owners ==
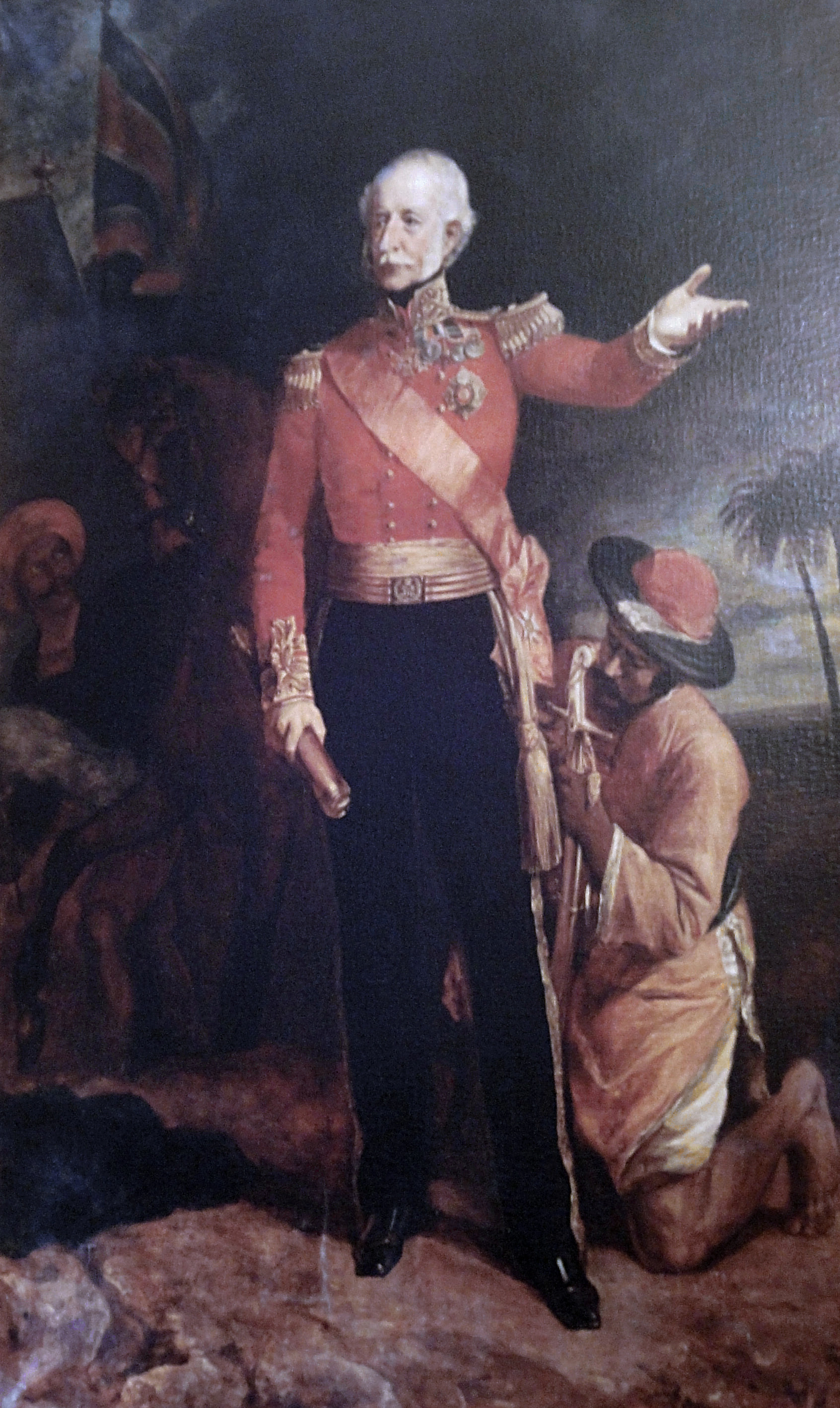
A painting of Hugh Gough, 1st Viscount Gough that hangs in the hallway.

- Thomas Cooley
- Robert Alexander
- Right Hon. John Doherty, Chief Justice of the Common Pleas
- Colonel Henry White
- Hugh Gough, 1st Viscount Gough
- George Gough, 2nd Viscount Gough
- Sir John Nutting
- Congregation of Christian Brothers

== Hotel ==
The Radisson Blu St Helen's hotel in south Co Dublin was acquired by the Scally family in 2024. The house is now part of the Hayfield Family Collection who have kept many of the original decorative features.

The meeting rooms listed below are named after notable past owners and local history.

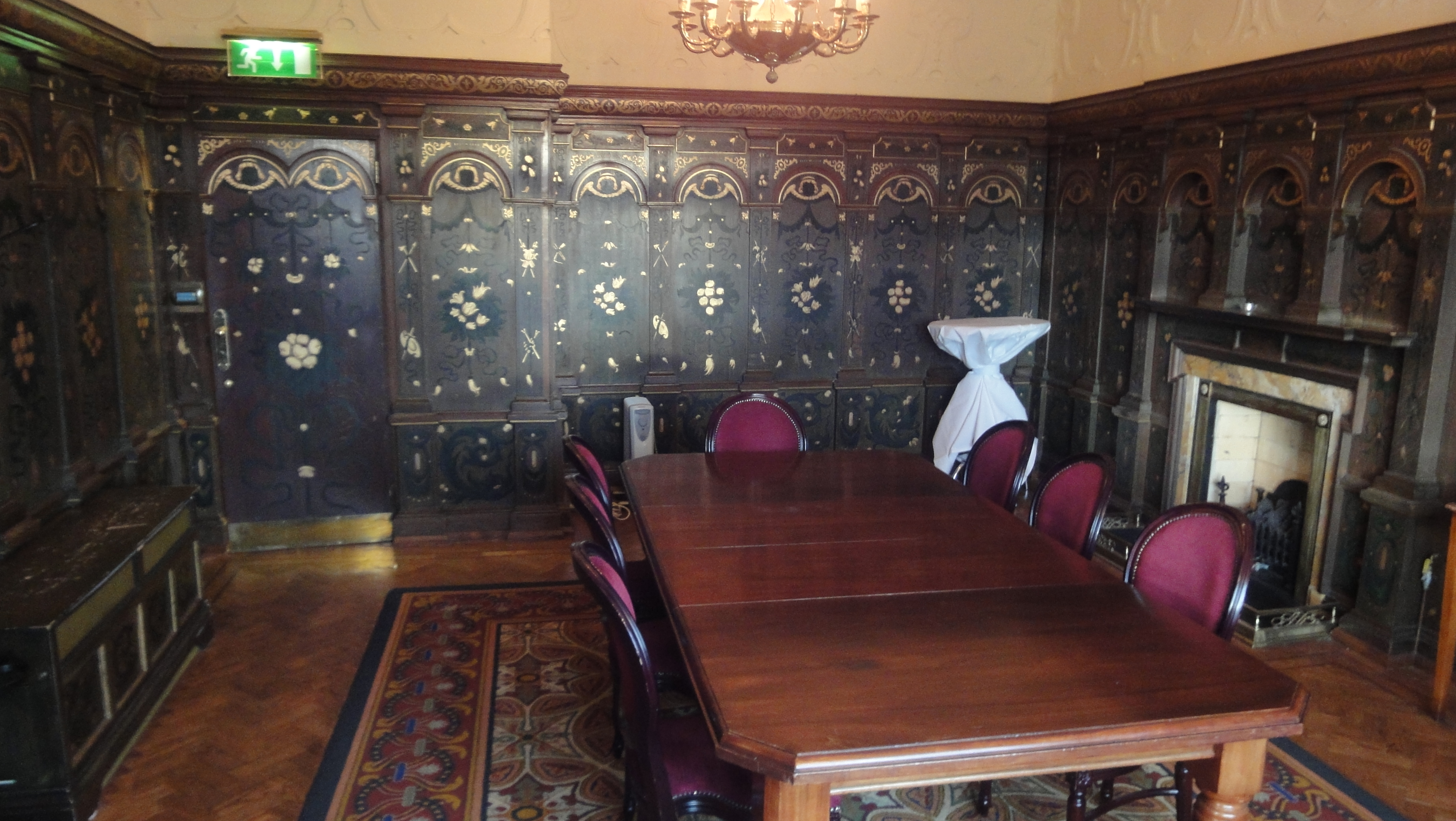
The Jacobean room which is decorated in the Jacobean style.

- Pembroke
- The Belville Room
- The Concourse
- The Jacobean Boardroom
- Lord Gough Room
- The Robert Alexander
- Shrewsbury Suite
- Sir John Nutting
- The Seamount Suite
- Thomas Cooley

The Talavera restaurant is named after Hugh Gough's participation in the Battle of Talavera.

Le Panto restaurant is named after the copper frieze of the Battle of Lepanto in the dining room.

== Gallery ==
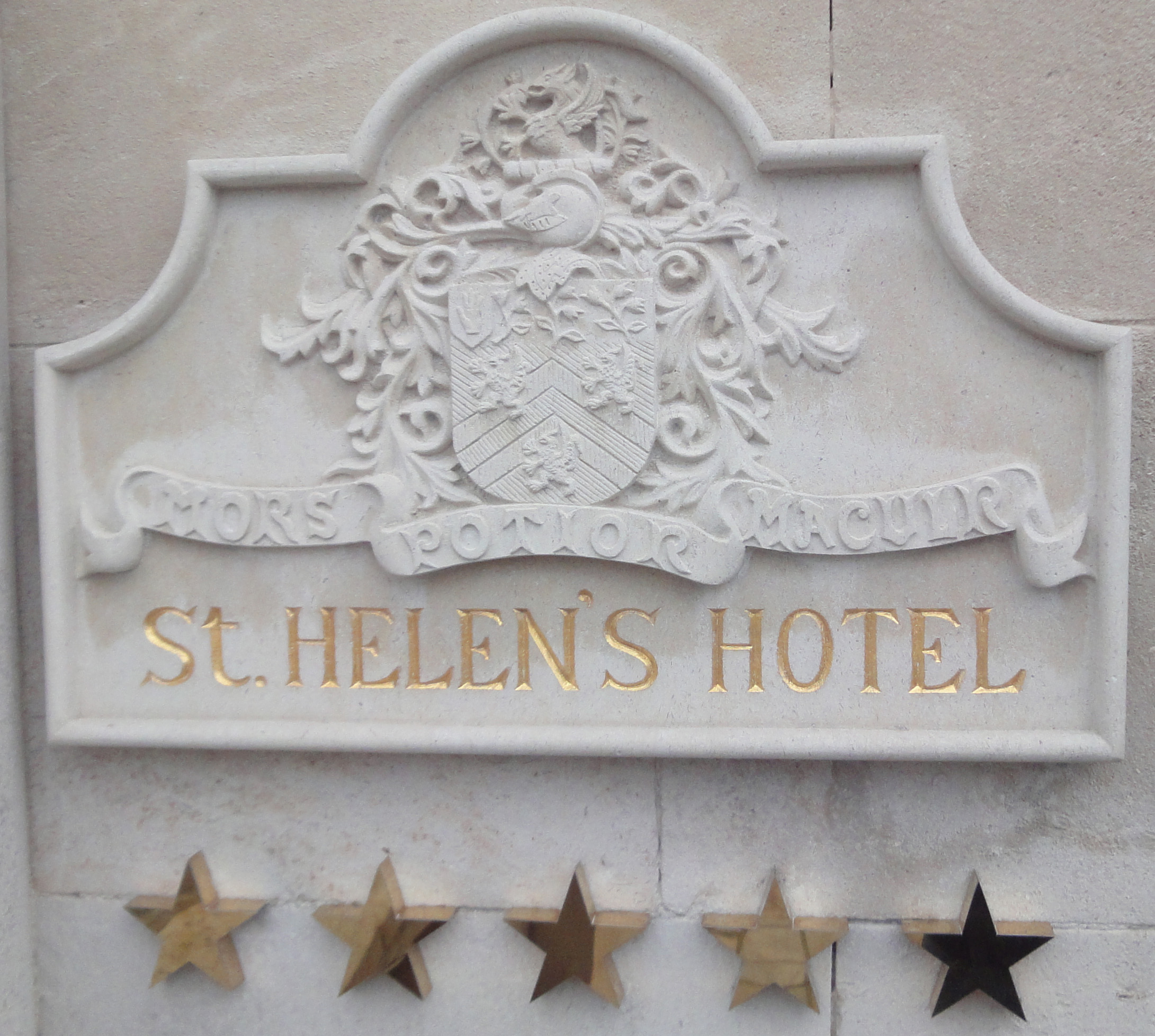
St. Helen's five-star Radisson hotel.

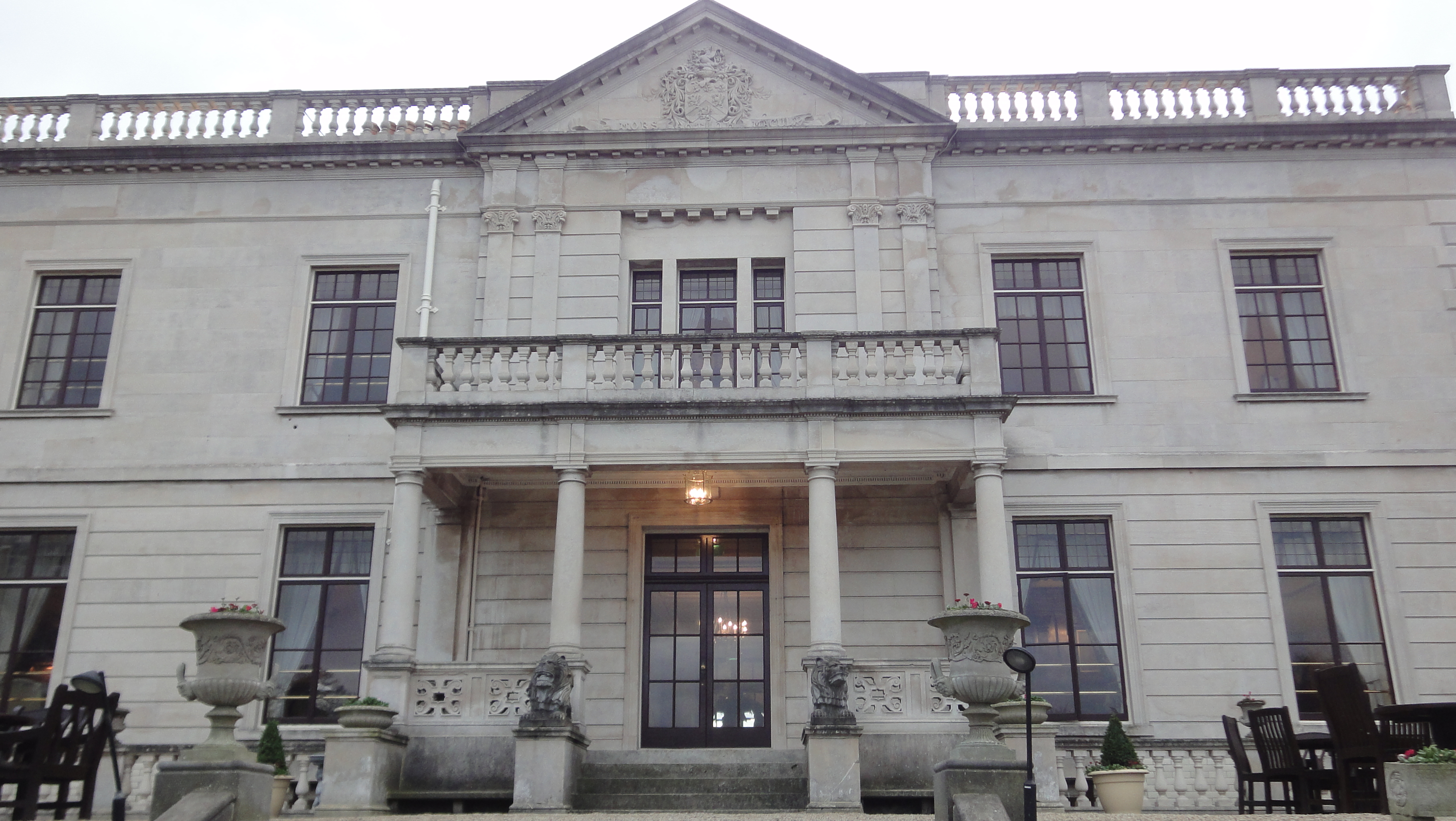
The rear of the house.

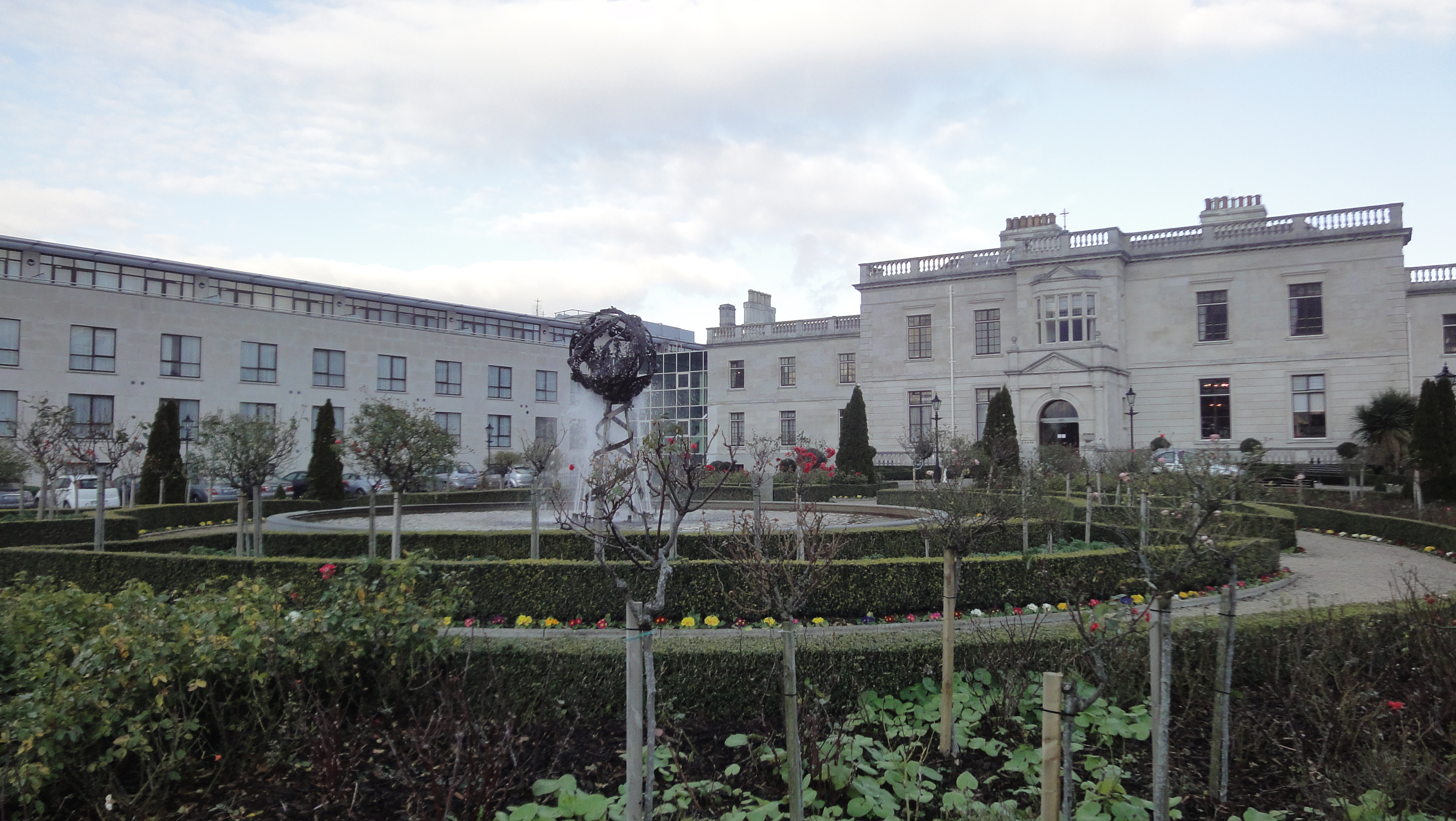
The new wing added during the refurbishment as a hotel.

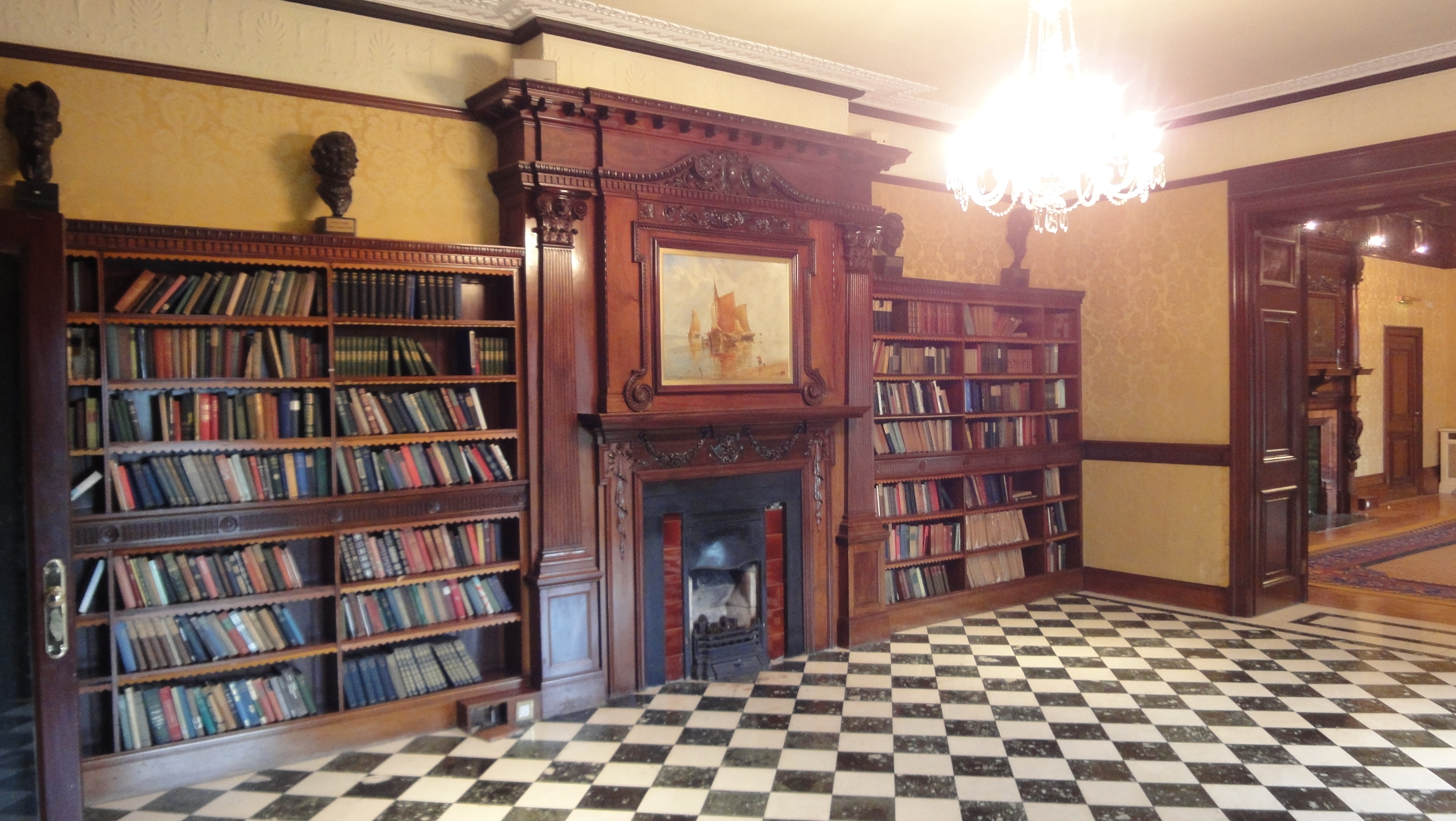
The Library in the main house.

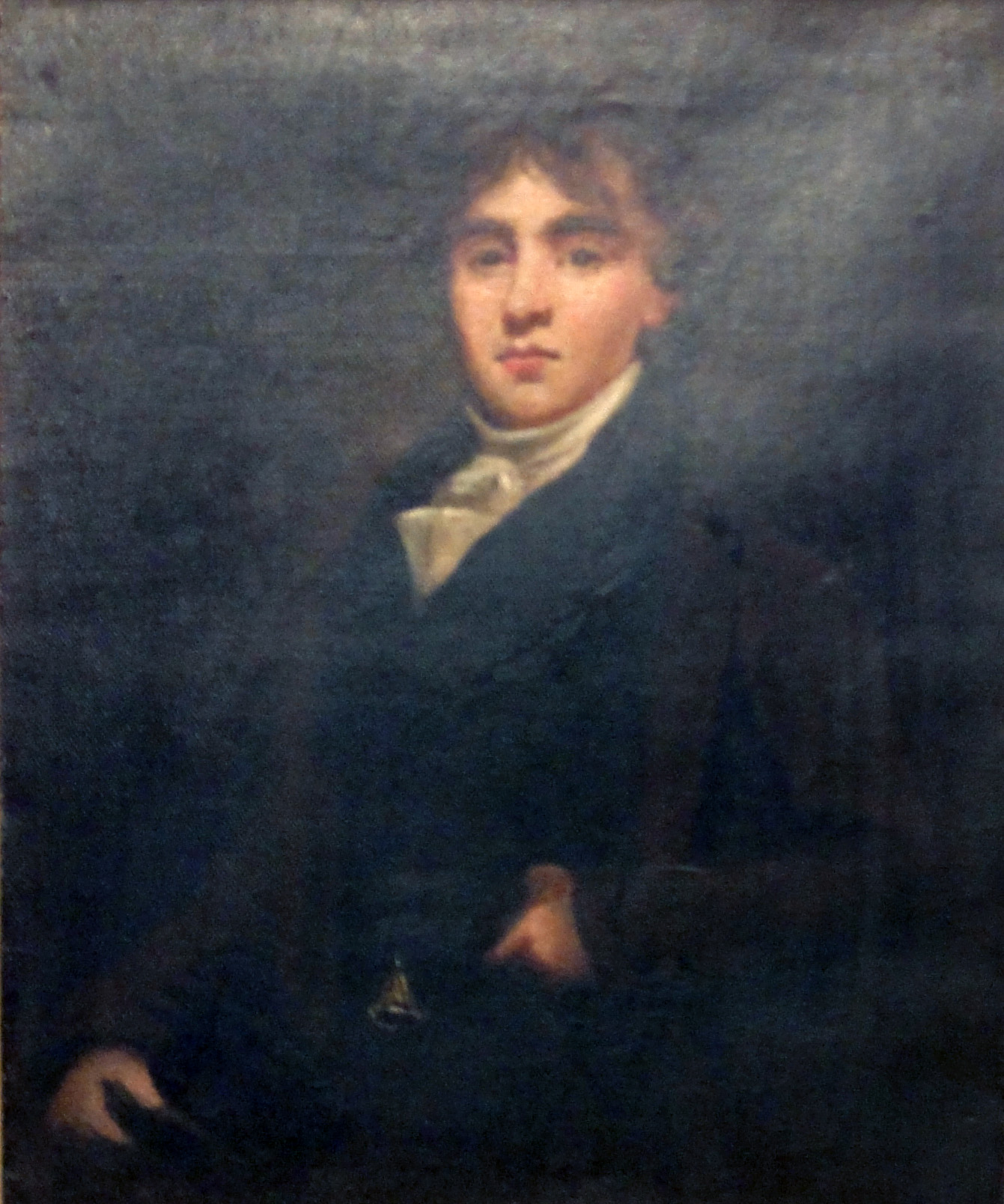
A painting hanging in the hallway of the house.

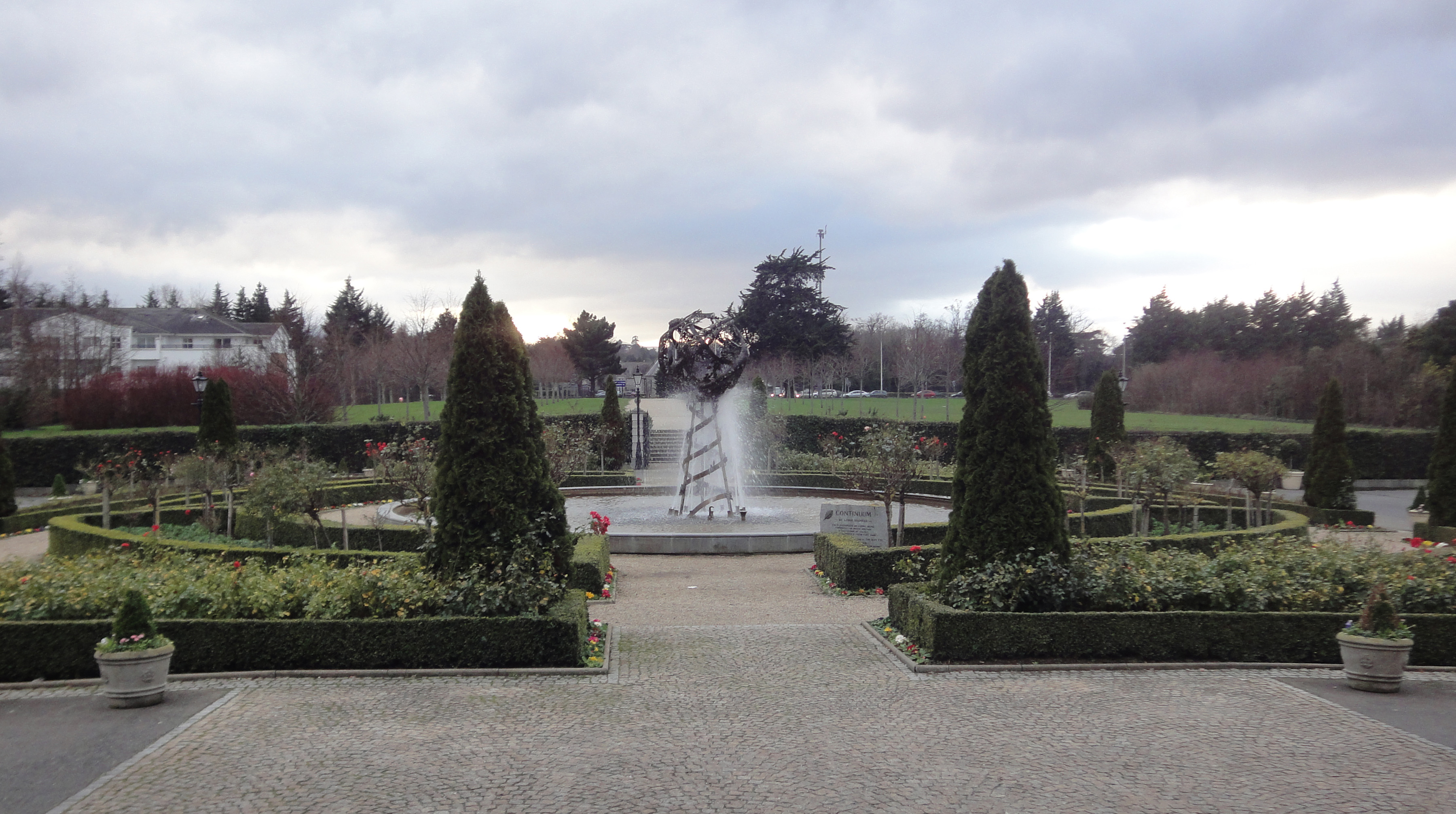
The Continuum sculpture by Linda Brunker.
