= Laurie Gough =

- Occupation: Writer
- Website: lauriegough.com

Laurie Gough is a Canadian author of memoirs and a freelance writer.

She is the author of Stolen Child: A Mother's Journey to Rescue Her Son from Obsessive Compulsive Disorder, published in 2016; Kiss the Sunset Pig: An American Road-trip with Exotic Detours, published in 2006 with Penguin, and Kite Strings of the Southern Cross: A Woman's Travel Odyssey, (published in Canada as Island of the Human Heart). Kite Strings of the Southern Cross was shortlisted for the Thomas Cook Travel Book Award, in the U.K. and was silver medal winner of ForeWord Magazine's Travel Book of the Year in the US.

She is the author of numerous travel articles. A number of her stories have been anthologized in various literary travel books, including salon.com's Wanderlust: Real-Life Tales of Adventure and Romance; AWOL: Tales for Travel-Inspired Minds; Sand in My Bra and Other Misadventures: Funny Women Write from the Road; Hyenas Laughed at Me and Now I Know Why: The Best of Travel Humor and Misadventure; and A Woman's Passion for Travel: True Stories of World Wanderlust.
