= Charles Gough =

Charles Gough may refer to:

- Charles Gough (artist) (1784–1805), artist of the romantic period
- Charles John Stanley Gough (1832–1912), soldier who won the Victoria Cross during the Sepoy mutiny
- Charles Hays Gough (1828–1895), American pioneer and politician
- Frederick Gough (MP for Horsham) (Charles Frederick Howard Gough, 1901–1977), soldier and MP for Horsham
- Charles Richard Gough (born 1962), Scottish footballer
- Charlie Gough (1939–2015), Scottish footballer
