= Richard McGough =

English footballer

Personal information
- Full name: Richard McGough
- Date of birth: 1892
- Place of birth: Carlisle, England
- Date of death: 18 April 1917 (aged 24–25)
- Place of death: Pas-de-Calais, France
- Position: Centre half

Senior career*
Years	Team	Apps	(Gls)
- Carlisle United
1914–1917	Newcastle United	2	(0)
- * Club domestic league appearances and goals

Richard McGough (1892 – 18 April 1917) was an English professional footballer who played in the Football League for Newcastle United as a centre half.

== Personal life ==
McGough served in the Royal Garrison Artillery during the First World War and was an acting bombardier when he died of wounds in France on 18 April 1917. He was buried in Feuchy British Cemetery.

== Career statistics ==
Appearances and goals by club, season and competition
Club	Season	League			FA Cup		Total	
Club	Season	Division	Apps	Goals	Apps	Goals	Apps	Goals
Newcastle United	1914–15	First Division	2	0	0	0	2	0
Career total			2	0	0	0	2	0
