= Hugh Sutlej Gough =

British Army general

Major-General Hugh Sutlej Gough CB CMG DL JP
- Born: 4 February 1848
- Died: 1920 (aged 71–72)
- Military career
- Allegiance: United Kingdom
- Branch: British Army
- Service years: 1862–1910
- Rank: Major-General
- Commands: 18th Royal Hussars
- Awards: Companion of the Order of the Bath; Companion of the Order of St Michael and St George

Major-General Hugh Sutlej Gough CB CMG DL JP (4 February 1848 – 1920) was a British Army officer who became Lieutenant Governor of Jersey.

== Military career ==
Gough joined the Royal Navy in 1862 and then transferred to 10th Royal Hussars in 1868. He was appointed aide-de-camp to the Commander-in-Chief, India in 1876 and then served in Afghanistan and Egypt before commanding 3rd Mounted Rifles for the Bechuanaland expedition in 1884. He became commanding officer of 18th Royal Hussars in 1889 and assistant adjutant for cavalry in 1893 before being made Lieutenant Governor of Jersey in 1904 and retiring in 1910.

On retirement he was given the colonelcy of the 20th Hussars in May 1910, a post he held until his death in 1920.

He lived at Llechweddygarth Hall in Montgomeryshire. He was also deputy lieutenant of Caernarvonshire.

== Family ==
In 1886, he married Beatrice Sophia Henning; they had a son and a daughter.

Government offices
Preceded by Henry Abadie	Lieutenant Governor of Jersey; 1904–1910	Succeeded by Sir Alexander Rochfort
