= Hugh Gough, 1st Viscount Gough =

British army officer (1779–1869)

Field Marshal The Right Honourable The Viscount Gough KP GCB GCSI PC
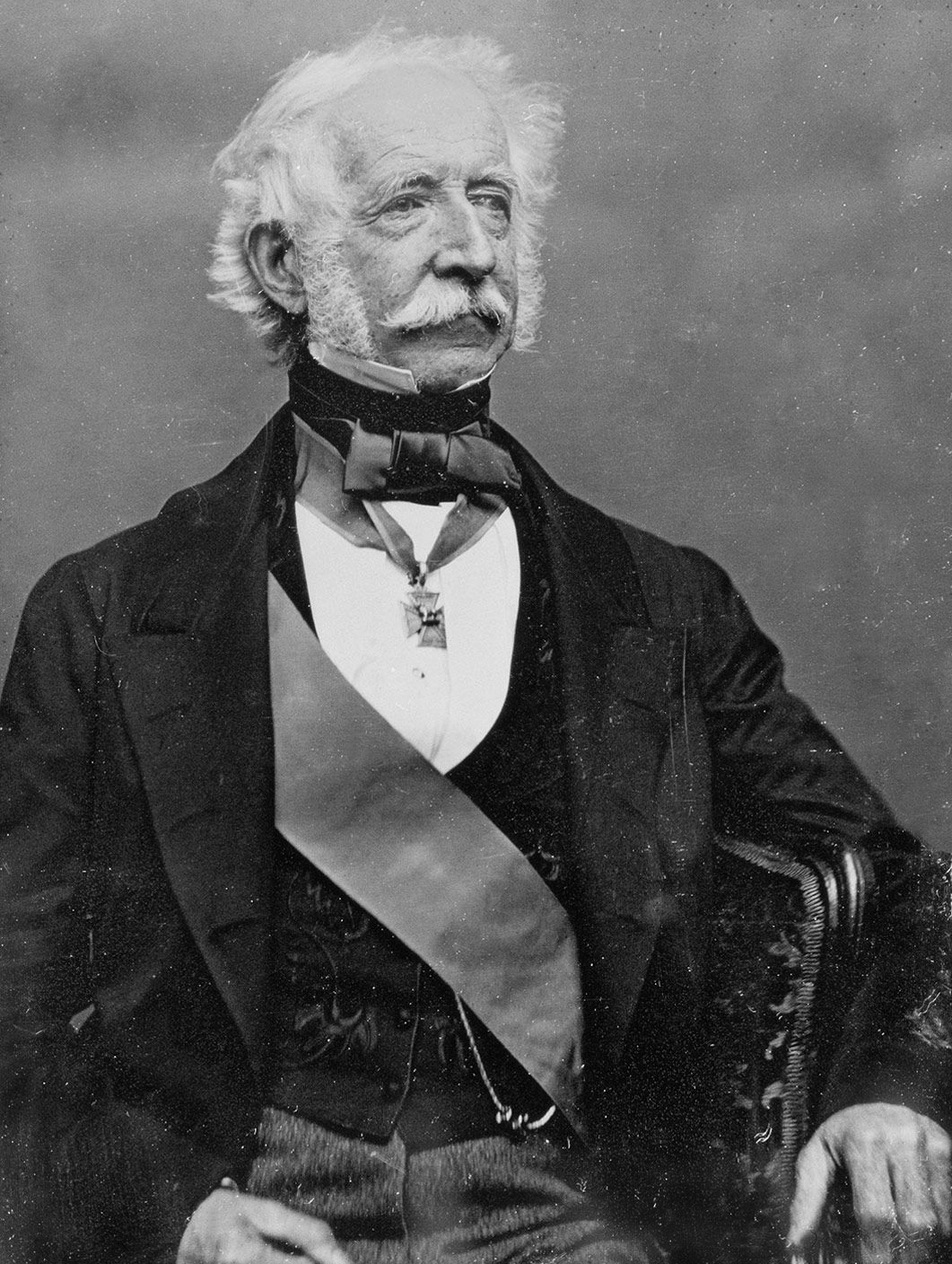
- Gough in 1850
- Born: 3 November 1779; Woodstown, Annacotty, County Limerick, Ireland
- Died: 2 March 1869 (aged 89); Booterstown, Dublin, Ireland
- Burial place: Stillorgan, Ireland
- Military career
- Allegiance: Great Britain; United Kingdom
- Branch: British Army; Madras Army
- Service years: 1794–1849
- Rank: Field marshal
- Commands: Commander-in-Chief in China; Commander-in-Chief in India
- Conflicts: French Revolutionary Wars; Peninsular War; First Opium War; Gwalior campaign; First Anglo-Sikh War; Second Anglo-Sikh War
- Awards: Knight of the Order of St Patrick; Knight Grand Cross of the Order of the Bath; Knight Grand Commander of the Order of the Star of India; Knight Bachelor; Army Gold Cross

Field Marshal Hugh Gough, 1st Viscount Gough, KP, GCB, GCSI, PC (3 November 1779 – 2 March 1869) was an Irish officer in the British Army. After serving as a junior officer in the British invasion of the Cape Colony during the French Revolutionary Wars, Gough commanded the 2nd Battalion of the 87th (Royal Irish Fusiliers) Regiment of Foot during the Peninsular War. During the First Opium War, he was commander-in-chief of the British forces in China. He then became commander-in-chief in India and led the British forces in action against the Marathas, defeating them decisively at the conclusion of the Gwalior campaign, as well as commanding the troops that defeated the Sikhs during both the First Anglo-Sikh War and the Second Anglo-Sikh War.

== Early career ==
Born into Anglo-Irish gentry, Gough was the son of Lieutenant Colonel George Gough and Letitia Gough (née Bunbury), of Lisnavagh. One of his ancestors was a Wiltshire-born descendant of Ranulf de Briquessart, who settled in Ireland in the 17th century.

Gough was commissioned into the Limerick Militia on 7 August 1793. He transferred to a locally raised regiment on 7 August 1794 and, having been promoted to lieutenant in the 119th Regiment of Foot on 11 October 1794, transferred to the 78th (Highlanders) Regiment of Foot on 6 June 1795. He took part in the British invasion of the Cape Colony in September 1795 during the French Revolutionary Wars and transferred to the 87th (Royal Irish Fusiliers) Regiment of Foot in December 1795, before being deployed with the 1st Battalion of the 87th to the West Indies, taking part in the expedition to Dutch Guiana in 1799. He was promoted to captain on 25 June 1803, and a year later, after his return, promoted to major of the newly raised 2nd Battalion of his Prince of Wales's Irish.

== Peninsular War ==
Gough joined Sir Arthur Wellesley in Spain in January 1809 and commanded the 2nd Battalion of his regiment at the Battle of Talavera in July 1809, during which he was wounded. He also fought at the Battle of Barrosa, where his regiment captured a French Imperial Eagle in March 1811. Promoted to brevet lieutenant colonel on 30 March 1811, he also took part in the Siege of Tarifa in January 1812, the Battle of Vitoria in June 1813 and the Battle of Nivelle, during which he was again badly wounded in November 1813. He was promoted to the substantive rank of lieutenant colonel on 25 May 1815, appointed a Companion of the Order of the Bath on 4 June 1815 and appointed a Knight Bachelor on 16 March 1816.

Promoted to colonel on 12 August 1819, Gough became commanding officer of the 22nd Regiment of Foot in County Tipperary where he also served as a local magistrate. He was promoted to major general on 22 July 1830 and advanced to Knight Commander of the Order of the Bath on 18 September 1831.

== Service in the east ==
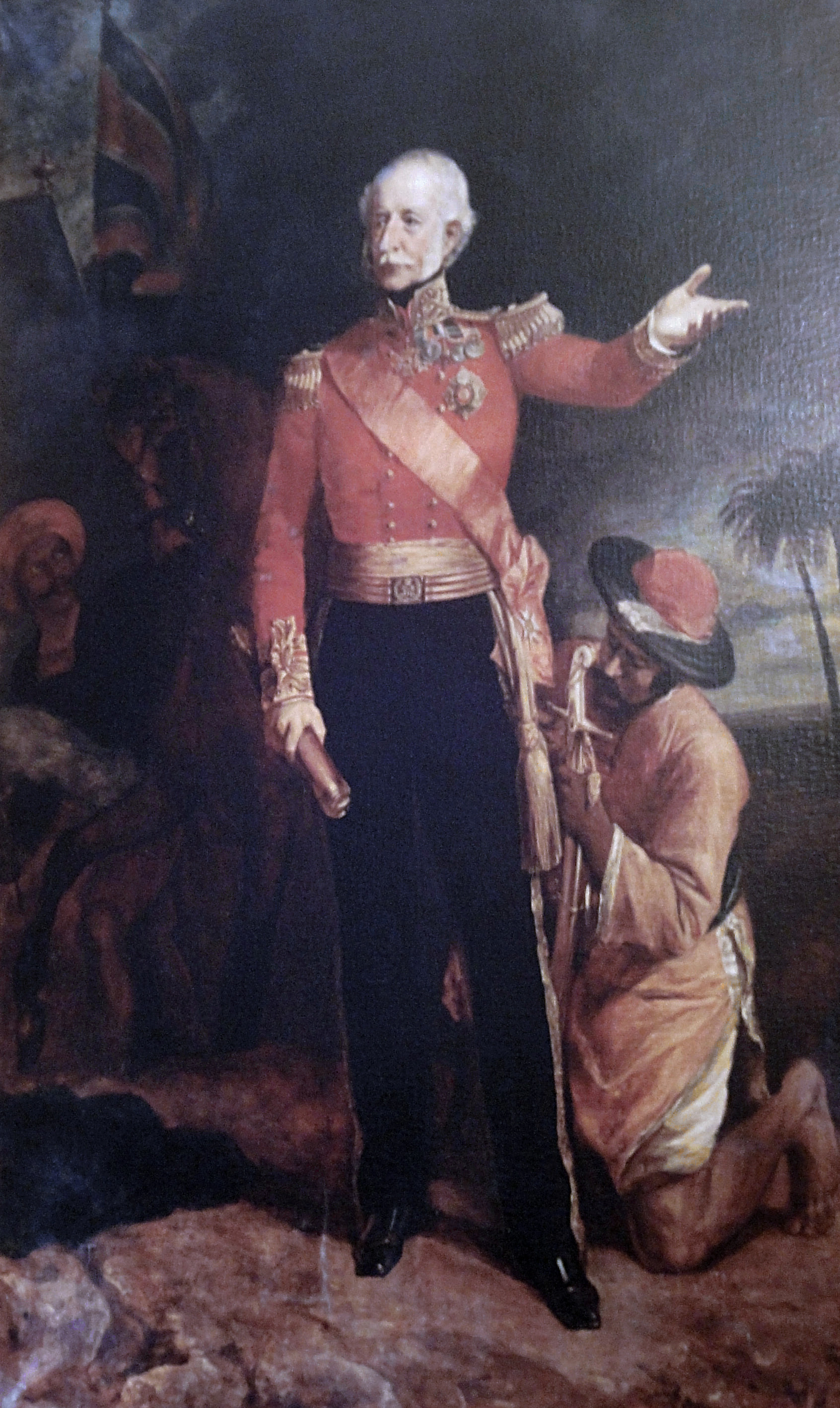
A painting of Hugh Gough that hangs in the hallway of St. Helen's, Booterstown, his former home in County Dublin, Ireland

Gough became General Officer Commanding the Mysore division of the Madras Army in 1837. At the outset of the First Opium War in March 1839 he was appointed commander-in-chief of the British forces in China. He led the assault at the Battle of Canton in May 1841, and having been promoted to the local rank of lieutenant general in India and in China on 18 June 1841, he also led the assault at the Battle of Amoy in August 1841. Advanced to Knight Grand Cross of the Order of the Bath on 14 October 1841 and promoted to the substantive rank of lieutenant general on 23 November 1841, he commanded the British forces at the Battle of Chapu in May 1842 and at the Battle of Chinkiang in July 1842. After the Treaty of Nanking, the British forces were withdrawn and he returned to India. He became a baronet on 1 December 1842 and was promoted to the local rank of full general in India on 3 March 1843.

In August 1843 Gough became Commander-in-Chief, India, and in December 1843 he led the British forces in action against the Mahrattas defeating them decisively at the conclusion of the Gwalior campaign. He also commanded the troops at the Battle of Mudki in December 1845, at the Battle of Ferozeshah also in December 1845 and at the Battle of Sobraon in February 1846 during the First Anglo-Sikh War. Gough was loyally supported by Lord Hardinge, the governor-general, who served under him during these actions. Gough was elevated to the peerage as Baron Gough of Chinkiang in China and of Maharajpore and the Sutlej in the East Indies on 7 April 1846.

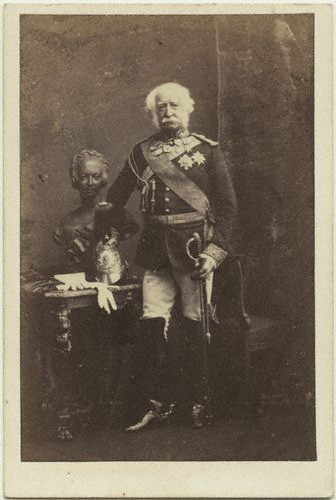
Hugh Gough, 1861, by Camille Silvy

The Second Anglo-Sikh War started in 1848, and again Gough took to the field commanding in person at the Battle of Ramnagar in November 1848 and at the Battle of Chillianwala in January 1849. He was criticised for relying on frontal assault by infantry rather than using artillery and was replaced as commander-in-chief by Sir Charles Napier but, before news of his replacement had arrived, Gough achieved a decisive victory over the Sikhs in the Battle of Gujarat in February 1849. He returned to Ireland and was advanced in the peerage as Viscount Gough of Goojerat in the Punjab and of the City of Limerick on 4 June 1849. He retired from active service later that year and was promoted to the substantive rank of full general on 20 June 1854.

Gough also served as colonel of the 99th Regiment of Foot, as colonel of the 87th (Royal Irish Fusiliers) Regiment of Foot and later as colonel of the Royal Horse Guards. In Dublin, he was a member of the Kildare Street Club. He was promoted to field marshal on 9 November 1862.

== Death and commemoration ==
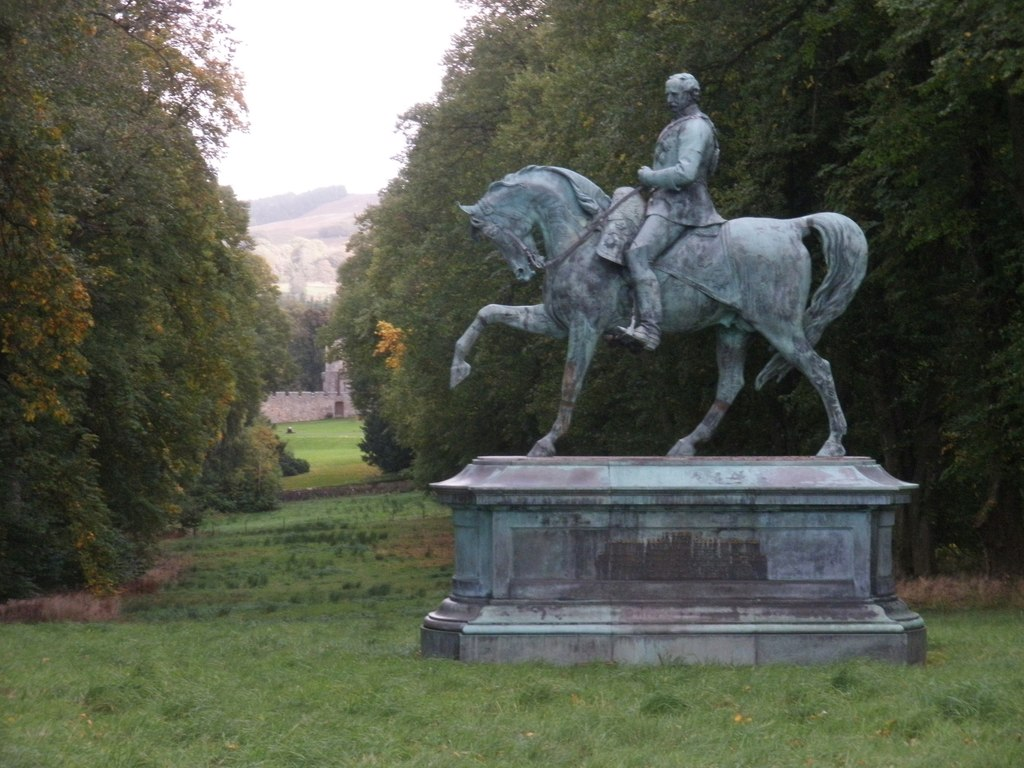
Gough Monument at Chillingham Castle by the Dublin-born sculptor John Henry Foley.

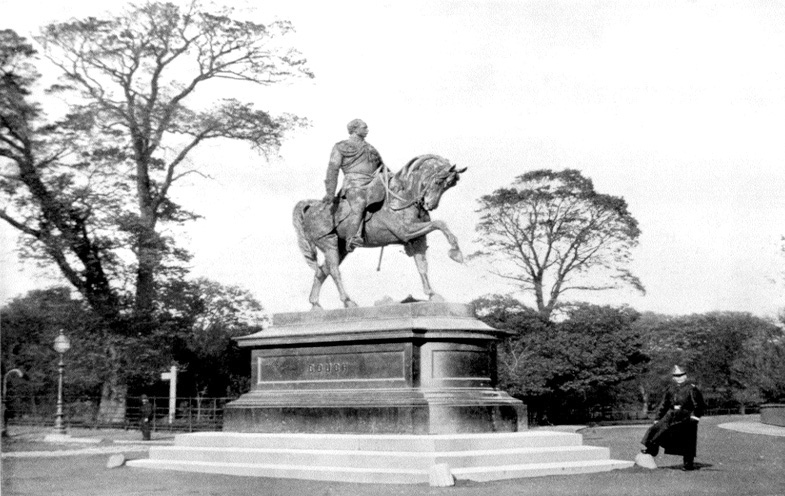
The statue as it originally stood, in the Phoenix Park, Dublin, from 1878 to 1957

He died at St. Helen's, his home in Booterstown, on 2 March 1869 and was buried in Stillorgan.

Proposals for a statue to Gough began in 1869 but were rejected by Dublin Corporation, including sites in Carlisle Bridge, Foster Place and Westmoreland Street. An equestrian statue of Gough by John Foley called the Gough Monument was ultimately erected outside the city, in Dublin's Phoenix Park in 1878 but, after being repeatedly vandalised in the 1940s and 1950s, it was moved to Chillingham Castle in Northumberland in 1990. The inscription reads:

In honour of Field Marshal Hugh Viscount Gough, K.P., G.C.B., G.C.S.I., an illustrious Irishman, whose achievements in the Peninsular War, in China, and in India, have added lustre to the military glory of his country, which he faithfully served for seventy five years. This statue [cast from cannon taken by troops under his command and granted by Parliament for the purpose] is erected by friends and comrades.

The cannon referred to were captured by Gough in China and India and yielded 15 tons of gun-metal for the statue.

== Family ==
In June 1807, Gough married Frances Maria Stephens, daughter of General Edward Stephens. His daughter, the Hon. Frances Maria Gough, was married to Field Marshal Sir Patrick Grant.

As the 1st Viscount Gough, he set down a family seat near Gort at Lough Cutra Castle, County Galway, Ireland, when purchased by him in 1852.

Gough's first cousins included Thomas Bunbury of Lisnavagh, County Carlow, MP for Carlow, and Jane McClintock of Drumcar, mother of the 1st Baron Rathdonnell.

== Arms ==
Coat of arms of Hugh Gough, 1st Viscount Gough
Crest 1st: a Boar's Head couped Or; 2nd: on a Mural Crown Argent a Lion passant guardant Or holding in the dexter paw two Flag Staves in bend sinister proper the one being the Union Flag of Great Britain and Ireland surmounting the other the staff thereof broken with a triangular Banner flowing therefrom to represent a Chinese Flag having thereon a Dragon and in an Escroll above the word "China"; 3rd: a Dexter Arm embowed in Facings of the 87th Regiment (Gules faced Vert) the hand grasping the Colour of the said Regiment displayed and a representation of a French Eagle reversed and depressed the staff broken proper in an Escroll above the word "Barossa". Escutcheon Quarterly: 1st and 4th, Gules on a Mount Vert a Lion passant guardant Or supporting with his dexter paw the Union Flag flowing to the sinister proper over the same in chief the words "China" and "India" in letters of gold; 2nd and 3rd, Azure on a Fess Argent between three Boars' Heads couped Or a Lion passant Gules in the centre chief point pendent from a Riband Argent fimbriated Azure a representation of the Badge of the Spanish Order of Charles III proper on a Chief within Battlements a Representation of the East Wall of the Fortress of Tarifa with a Breach between two Turrets the dexter Turret surmounted by the British Flag flying all proper. Supporters Dexter: a Lion reguardant Or gorged with an Eastern Crown Gules the rim inscribed with the word "Punjab" in letters of gold with Chain reflexed over the back also Gold; Sinister: a Chinese Dragon Or gorged with a Mural Crown Sable inscribed with the word "China" and chained Gold. Motto Above the centre Crest: Faugh a Ballagh (Clear the way); Below the shield: Goojerat.

== Bibliography ==
- Escott, Thomas Hay Sweet (1913). Club Makers and Club Members. pp. 329–333.
- Heathcote, Tony (1999). The British Field Marshals, 1736–1997: A Biographical Dictionary. Barnsley: Leo Cooper. ISBN 0-85052-696-5.
- Usherwood, Paul (2000). Public sculpture of North-East England. Liverpool University Press. ISBN 978-0853236351.

Military offices
Preceded by Sir Jasper Nicolls	Commander-in-Chief, India; 1843–1849	Succeeded by Sir Charles Napier
Preceded by The Lord Raglan	Colonel of the Royal Regiment of Horse Guards (The Blues); 1855–1869	Succeeded by The Lord Strathnairn
Preceded by Sir Thomas Reynell, Bt	Colonel of the 87th (Royal Irish Fusiliers) Regiment of Foot; 1841–1855	Succeeded by James Simpson
Preceded by Sir Thomas Arbuthnot	Colonel of the 99th (Lanarkshire) Regiment of Foot; 1839–1841	Succeeded by Sir Howard Douglas, Bt
Peerage of the United Kingdom
New creation	Viscount Gough; 1849–1869	Succeeded by George Stephens Gough
New creation	Baron Gough; 1846–1869	Succeeded by George Stephens Gough
Baronetage of the United Kingdom
New creation	Baronet (of Synone and Drangan); 1842–1869	Succeeded by George Stephens Gough
