= Arthur Noss =

British World War I flying ace

Arthur Rex Hurden Noss
- Born: 22 January 1897; Hornsey, London, England
- Died: 15 September 1917 (aged 20) (DOW)
- Burial place: Zuydcoote Military Cemetery, Nord, France; 51°03′40″N 2°29′05″E
- Military career
- Allegiance: United Kingdom
- Branch: British Army
- Rank: Second Lieutenant
- Unit: No. 48 Squadron RFC
- Awards: Military Cross

Second Lieutenant Arthur Rex Hurden Noss MC (22 January 1897 – 15 September 1917) was a British World War I flying ace credited with nine aerial victories. He won a Military Cross as Keith Park's gunner, and was killed in a flying accident shortly thereafter.

== Early life ==
Arthur Rex Hurden Noss was the only child of Mr. and Mrs. Arthur Alfred Noss of Crouch End. He was educated at Kent Coast College, Herne Bay, winning eight athletic prizes in his final year.

== World War I ==
Noss began his military service as a gunner (regimental number 625052) in the Honourable Artillery Company.

On 4 April 1917, Noss was commissioned as a temporary second lieutenant on probation. Noss was on the General List of the Royal Flying Corps when he was appointed as a flying officer (observer) on 20 June 1917. His seniority date of appointment was set at 16 May 1917, indicating he began actual duties as an observer/gunner then.

Noss was assigned to No. 48 Squadron as an observer/gunner in Bristol F.2 two-seater fighters in March 1917. He scored his first aerial victory on 27 May 1917, and would score one more before pairing up with Keith Park. On 19 July, this aircrew suffered a magneto failure and a crash-landing that injured Noss. On 2 August 1917, Flight magazine reported Noss had been wounded.

Noss and Park would go on to score seven victories in August 1917, with an outstanding performance on the 17th. That was the day that Park went to the rescue of a Sopwith Camel being attacked by three German Albatros D.IIIs. In the process of driving the three Germans away, Noss and Park were assailed by two more of the enemy. Noss fired at the attacking pair; when they overran his fighter, Park took his turn and shot them both down. At that point, another trio of Germans attacked; Noss spun one of them out with machine gun fire. Park chased after the falling German; still another three Germans attacked, but they also overran the British crew. Park then saw a second Sopwith Camel under attack from a German, and pumped 100 rounds of machine gun ammunition into the German from 50 yards range. The German spun out, for the British crew's fourth win of the day. They would win the Military Cross for this action; the award was announced on 26 September 1917.

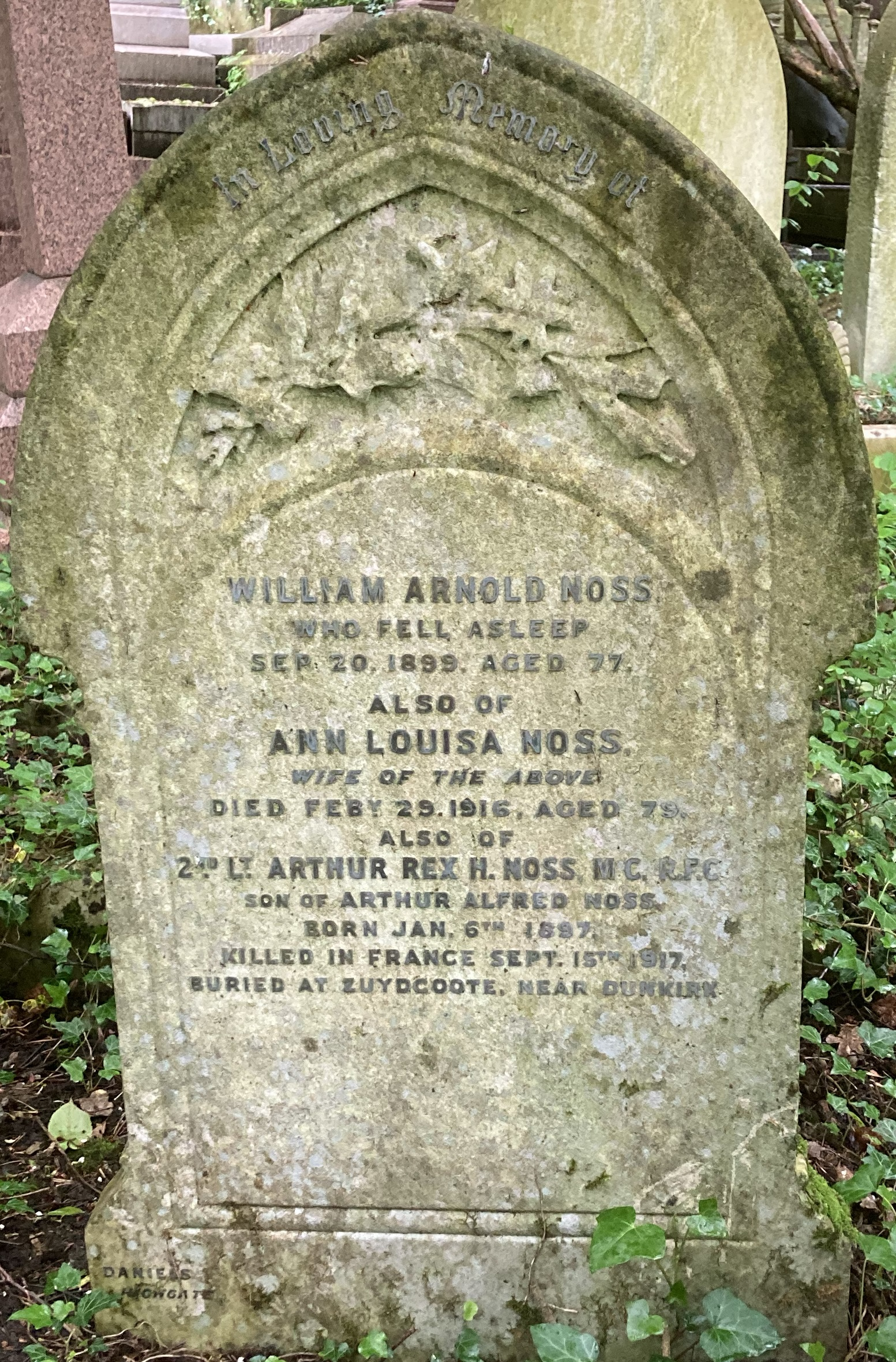
Noss family grave in Highgate Cemetery

Second Lieutenant Arthur Rex Noss was injured in a crash on 15 September 1917, died as a result of his injuries that evening or the following day. He is buried in plot I. E. 1, Zuydcoote Military Cemetery, Nord, France.

Noss's Military Cross was gazetted posthumously on 9 January 1918. His citation read:

Temporary Second Lieutenant Arthur Rex Hurden Noss, General List & R.F.C.

"For conspicuous gallantry and devotion to duty. During an engagement with several large hostile formations the two machines with which he was patrolling were put out of action. In spite, however, of being left alone he continued to attack, and engaged the enemy in so determined a manner that he and his pilot between them destroyed one and drove three others down completely out of control. He has performed several other fine feats and has at all times set a most inspiring example by his dash and tenacity."

He is also commemorated on the family grave of his grandparents on the west side of Highgate Cemetery.

== List of aerial victories ==
Combat record
No.	Date/time	Aircraft	Foe	Result	Location	Notes
1	26 May 1917 @ 1945 hours	Bristol F.2 Fighter serial number A7117	Albatros D.III	Driven down out of control	Southeast of Douai	Pilot: H. M. Frazer
2	11 June 1917 @ 1100 hours	Bristol F.2 Fighter s/n A7137	German two-seater airplane	Destroyed	Vitry	Pilot: H. Smithers
3	12 August 1917 @ 1045 hours	Bristol F.2 Fighter s/n A7176	Albatros D.III	Driven down out of control	South of Slype	Pilot: Keith Park
4	16 August 1917 @ 1130 hours	Bristol F.2 Fighter s/n A7182	DFW reconnaissance plane	Driven down out of control	Slype	Pilot: Keith Park
5	17 August 1917 @ 0655 hours	Bristol F.2 Fighter s/n A7182	Albatros D.V	Driven down out of control	West of Slype	Pilot: Keith Park
6	17 August 1917 @ 0655 hours	Bristol F.2 Fighter s/n A7182	Albatros D.V	Destroyed	West of Slype	Pilot: Keith Park
7	17 August 1917 @ 0715 hours	Bristol F.2 Fighter s/n A7182	Albatros D.V	Driven down out of control	Off Slype	Pilot: Keith Park
8	17 August 1917 @ 0725 hours	Bristol F.2 Fighter s/n A7182	Albatros D.V	Driven down out of control	Slype	Pilot: Keith Park
9	25 August 1917 @ 2000 hours	Bristol F.2 Fighter s/n A7213	Albatros D.V	Set afire; destroyed	South of Slype	Pilot: Keith Park
