= Keith Park =

New Zealand soldier, aviator and former Royal Air Force Air Chief Marshal (1892–1975)

Sir Keith Park
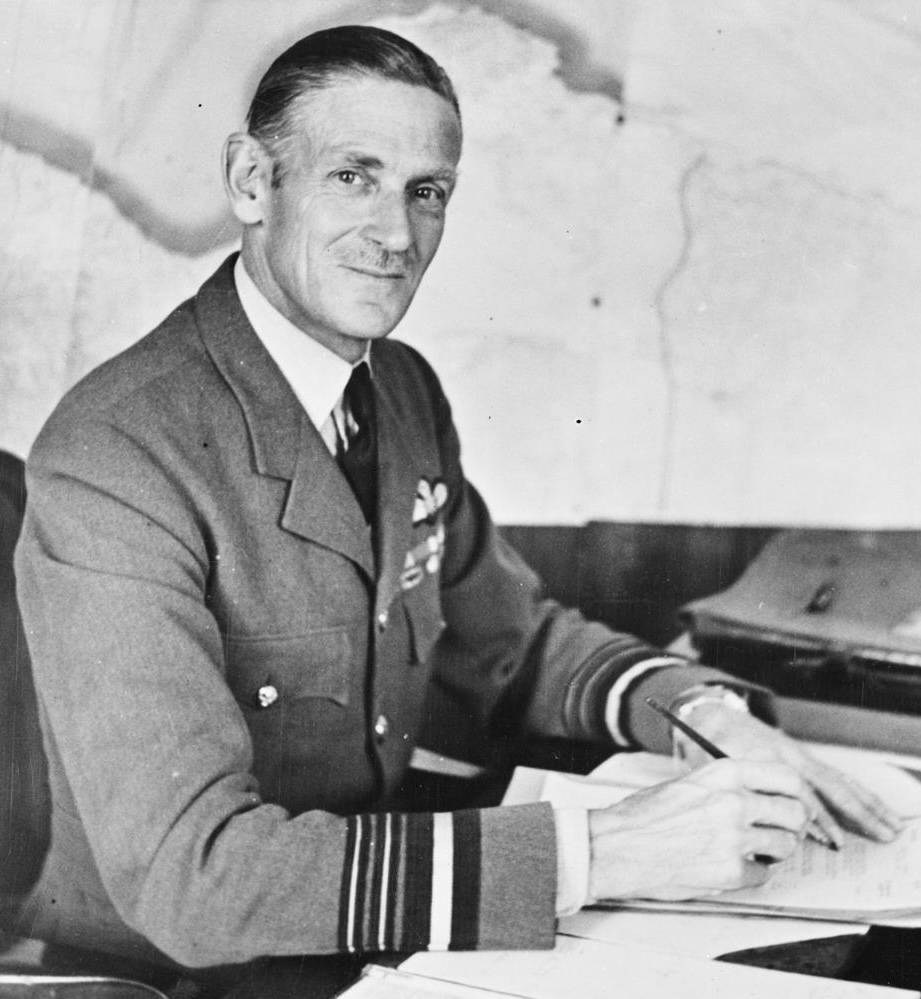
- Park in 1940
- Born: 15 June 1892; Thames, New Zealand
- Died: 6 February 1975 (aged 82); Auckland, New Zealand
- Military career
- Allegiance: New Zealand (1911–1915); United Kingdom (1915–1946)
- Branch: New Zealand Military Forces (1911–1915); British Army (1915–1918); Royal Air Force (1918–1946)
- Service years: 1911–1946
- Rank: Air Chief Marshal
- Nicknames: "The Defender of London" "Skipper"
- Commands: Air Command, South East Asia (1945–1946); Middle East Command (1944–1945); AHQ Malta (1942–1944); AHQ Egypt (1942); No. 23 (Training) Group (1940–1942); No. 11 (Fighter) Group (1940); RAF Tangmere (1937–38); RAF Northolt (1931–1932); No. 111 Squadron (1927–1928); No. 48 Squadron (1918–1919)
- Conflicts: First World War; Gallipoli campaign; Battle of the Somme; Second World War; Battle of Britain; Mediterranean theatre; Battle of Malta; South-East Asia theatre; Burma campaign
- Awards: Knight Grand Cross of the Order of the Bath; Knight Commander of the Order of the British Empire; Military Cross & Bar; Distinguished Flying Cross; Croix de guerre (France); Commander of the Legion of Merit (United States)
- Other work: City Councillor, New Zealand

Air Chief Marshal Sir Keith Rodney Park, GCB, KBE, MC & Bar, DFC (15 June 1892 – 6 February 1975) was a New Zealand-born officer of the Royal Air Force (RAF). During the Second World War, his leadership of the RAF's No. 11 Group was pivotal to the defeat of the Luftwaffe in the Battle of Britain.

Born in the town of Thames in New Zealand's North Island, Park was a mariner when he enlisted in the New Zealand Expeditionary Force for service in the First World War. Posted to the artillery, he fought in the Gallipoli campaign, during which he transferred to the British Army. On the Western Front, he was present for the Battle of the Somme and was wounded. On recovery, he transferred to the Royal Flying Corps. After flight training, he served as an instructor before being posted to No. 48 Squadron on the Western Front. He became a flying ace, achieving several aerial victories and eventually commanding the squadron.

In the interwar period, Park served with the RAF in a series of command and staff postings, including a period as air attaché in South America. By the late 1930s, he was serving in Fighter Command, as Air Marshal Hugh Dowding's senior air staff officer. The two worked to devise tactics and management strategies for the air defence of the United Kingdom. Soon after the outbreak of the Second World War, Park was given command of No. 11 Group, responsible for the defence of South East England and London. Owing to its strategic significance and geographic location in relation to the Luftwaffe, No. 11 Group bore the brunt of the German aerial assault during the Battle of Britain. Park's management of his fighter aircraft and pilots helped ensure that Britain retained air superiority along the English Channel.

After the Battle of Britain, Park served in a training role before being posted in late 1941 to the Middle East as Air Officer Commanding, Egypt. In mid-1942, he took charge of the aerial defences of Malta, then under heavy attack from the Luftwaffe and the Regia Aeronautica (Italian Air Force). When the siege was lifted Park transitioned Malta's RAF forces from a defensive role into an offensive footing in preparation for the Allied invasion of Sicily. From 1944, he held senior roles in the Middle East and in British India. He retired from the RAF in 1946 as an air chief marshal. Returning to New Zealand, he worked in the aviation industry for a British aircraft manufacturer and then became involved in local body politics in Auckland. He died from heart problems in February 1975 at the age of 82.

== Early life ==
Born in Thames, New Zealand, on 15 June 1892, Keith Rodney Park was the third son and ninth child of Professor James Livingstone Park from Scotland, a geologist and director of the Thames School of Mines, and his wife, New Zealand native Frances Rogers. Park was schooled at King's College in Auckland until 1905. The following year he attended Otago Boys' High School in Dunedin, where his father had moved the family following his appointment as a lecturer in mining at the University of Otago. By this time Park's parents had separated, his mother moving to Australia and leaving the children in the care of their father.

At Otago Boys' High, Park joined the school's Cadet Corps. Completing his education, he found employment at the Union Steam Ship Company. He had always enjoyed boats and within the Park family was known as "Skipper". He went to sea as a purser aboard collier and passenger steamships, initially on vessels sailing along the coast but later on ships travelling to Australia and islands in the Pacific. He also served as a Territorial soldier in the New Zealand Field Artillery from March 1911 to November 1913.

== First World War ==
Soon after outbreak of the First World War, Park's employers gave him permission to leave the company and join the war effort. He enlisted in the New Zealand Expeditionary Force (NZEF) on 14 December 1914, and was posted to the Field Artillery. He was promoted to corporal in early February 1915. Park departed New Zealand the same month as part of the third draft of reinforcements for the NZEF, destined for the Middle East. On arrival, he was posted to the 4th Howitzer Battery, under the command of Major Norrie Falla.

In early April 1915, military planners in London decided that the NZEF should be part of the Allied forces that would open up a new front in the Middle East by landing on the Gallipoli Peninsula. Park participated in the Landing at Anzac Cove on 25 April, going ashore that evening or early the following morning with his battery. The 4th Howitzer Battery was the only such unit at Anzac Cove but had limited ammunition and initially was unable to expend more than a few rounds a day. When not engaged in artillery fire, Park acted as a messenger. In the trench warfare that followed, Park's achievements were recognised and in July he was commissioned a second lieutenant. He commanded an artillery battery during the August offensive. Afterwards Park took the unusual decision to transfer from the NZEF to the British Army, relinquishing his commission and joining the Royal Horse and Field Artillery. He never explained his motivations for doing so.

Attached to the 29th Division as a temporary second lieutenant, Park was posted to No. 10 Battery, of the 147th Brigade, at Helles. He was commander of a 12-pounder naval gun, which was often subject to Turkish counter-fire. He and the rest of his battery was evacuated from Gallipoli to Egypt in January 1916, after the decision was made to abandon the Allied positions there. The battle had left its mark on him both physically and mentally, though later on in life he would remember it with nostalgia. He particularly admired the Australian and New Zealand Army Corps commander, Sir William Birdwood, whose leadership style and attention to detail was a model for Park in his later career.

In March, Park's battery, along with the rest of the 29th Division, was shipped to the Western Front and assigned to a sector along the Somme. Two months later, Park's rank was made substantive. By this time he had an interest in aviation; while in Egypt preparing for the move to France, he had requested a flight so that he could assess its suitability to help in observations but was told that aerial reconnaissance was a waste of time. Now, prior to the Battle of the Somme, he learned how useful aircraft could be in a military role, getting a taste of flight by being taken aloft to check his battery's camouflage. He reported back on the ready manner in which the British guns could be detected. During the battle itself, which commenced on 1 July, the artillery was heavily engaged. On 21 October, while trying to withdraw an unserviceable gun for repair, Park was blown off his horse by a German shell. Wounded, he was evacuated to England and medically certified "unfit for active service", which technically meant he was unfit to ride a horse. After a brief remission recovering from his wounds, recuperating and doing training duties at Woolwich Depot, he joined the Royal Flying Corps (RFC) in December. He had been trying for some time to obtain a transfer but the senior officers in the 29th Division would not allow this for its personnel serving in France; in later years Park saw his wounding as being particularly fortuitous for his future military career.

== Royal Flying Corps ==
Park's RFC training commenced at Reading with a course at the School of Military Aeronautics. Much of this initial training involved military basics, such as drill, and theoretical matters, like Morse code. His flight instruction did not commence until he went to Netheravon where, after flying an Avro 504K with an instructor, he soloed in a Maurice Farman MF11 Shorthorn. The RFC still lacked sophistication in its flight training, and many pilots were sent to France with little more than basic flying skills. Park, having accumulated over 20 hours solo and 30 hours flying, had qualified for his wings and was posted to Rendcomb for instructing duties in March 1917.

At Rendcomb, Park accumulated over 100 hours flying time before, in June, he was posted to France. The time he had spent in the air at this stage enhanced his survival prospects in aerial combat. On reporting to RFC headquarters in Boulogne, he was advised that he was to be a bomber pilot and sent to a depot pool of pilots at Saint-Omer. This was despite his specialisation in fighter aircraft. After some days without an assignment, he contacted No. 48 Squadron, a fighter unit at La Bellevue; this resulted in Park's posting to that squadron on 7 July.

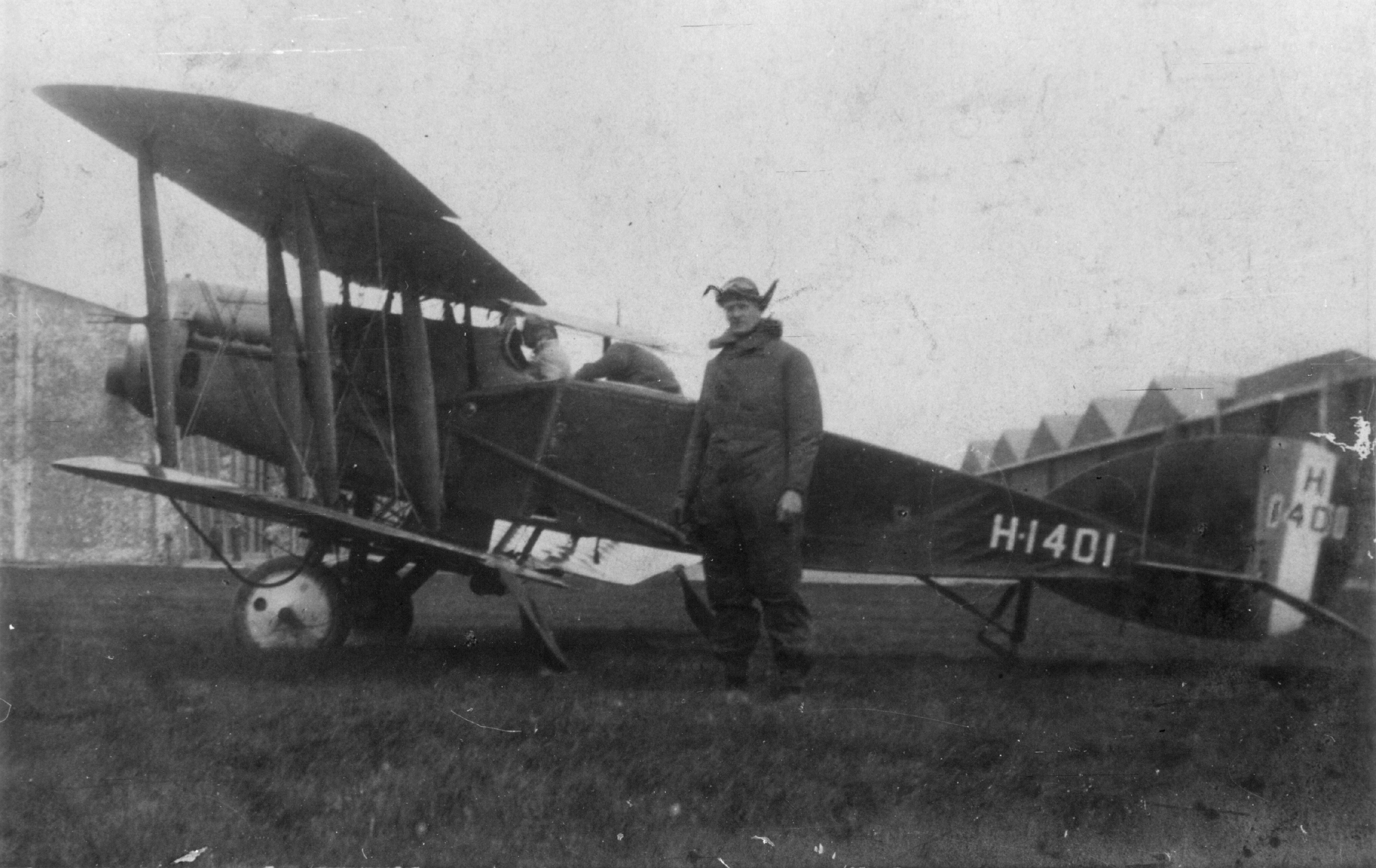
Park, wearing a Sidcot suit, beside a Bristol Fighter, c. 1917–18

=== Service with No. 48 Squadron ===
Shortly after Park's arrival at No. 48 Squadron, the unit moved to Frontier Aerodrome just east of Dunkirk. The squadron was equipped with the new Bristol Fighter, a two-seat biplane fighter and reconnaissance aircraft, and carried out patrols and reconnaissance flights. It also escorted bombers attacking German airfields in Belgium. Park had his first encounter with fighters of the Imperial German Air Service on 24 July 1917, when he was engaged by three Albatros D.III scout aircraft near Middelkerke. He and his observer, Second Lieutenant A. Merchant, operating a Lewis gun, drove off the attackers, sending one out of control. When the Germans started using their heavy bombers to attack London and other targets in England during the summer, No. 48 Squadron was tasked with interception duties. Park never saw any bombers on these flights.

Park achieved his second aerial victory on 12 August when, flying with Second Lieutenant Arthur Noss as his observer, he was attacked by a pair of Albatrosses while returning to base after a patrol. Sustained gun fire from Noss drove an Albatros out of control. On 16 August, again paired with Noss, the duo combined to send a DFW C.V reconnaissance aircraft out of control. The following day Park and Noss engaged in a prolonged dogfight that began at 15,000 feet (4,600 m) over Slijpe and ended near Ghistelles at a height of 3,000 feet (910 m). The pair destroyed one Albatros, seeing it crash into the sea, and sent three others out of control. In recognition of their successes, the commander of 4th Brigade, Brigadier-General John Becke, recommended Park and Noss for the Military Cross (MC). This was duly awarded, the published citation for Park's MC reading:

For conspicuous gallantry and devotion to duty. During an engagement with several large hostile formations, the two machines with which he was patrolling were put out of action. In spite, however, of being left alone, he continued to attack, and engaged the enemy in so determined a manner that he and his observer between them destroyed one and drove three others down completely out of control. He has performed several other fine feats, and has at all times set a most inspiring example by his dash and tenacity.

— The London Gazette, No. 30466, 9 January 1918.

On 21 August Park, flying with Second Lieutenant W. O'Toole while Noss was rested, drove two Albatros scouts out of control. Back with Noss on 25 August, the pair destroyed an Albatros south of Slijpe. On 2 September, with Alan Light, Park had two separate engagements with Albatrosses near Diksmuide; both aircraft that he and Light fired at were seen to be going down in an uncontrolled manner. On 5 September Park, flying with Air Mechanic H. Lindfield, killed a pilot of Jasta Boelcke, Franz Pernet, the stepson of General Erich Ludendorff, off Ostend. Flying near Slijpe on 9 September, he and Lindfield drove an Albatros out of control, and two days later Park was promoted to temporary captain. He destroyed an Albatros on 14 September, with Second Lieutenant H. Owen as his observer, and sent another Albatros out of control. Park was the squadron's most successful pilot over the August–September period and Becke recommended him for the Distinguished Service Order. The senior officer of the RFC in France, Major-General Hugh Trenchard, downgraded this to a Bar to his MC on the basis that this was sufficient reward. The published citation read:

For conspicuous gallantry and devotion to duty in accounting for nine enemy aircraft, three of which were completely destroyed and six driven down out of control.

— The London Gazette, No. 30583, 18 March 1918.

Towards the end of September, No. 48 Squadron moved to the Arras sector, having incurred several casualties in the previous weeks. There, Park, now a flight leader, concentrated on preparing his command, which contained many inexperienced replacement pilots, for aerial combat. It was now involved in less dangerous work, mostly reconnaissance patrols, and casualties were light. In November, he was awarded a French honour, the Croix de guerre, for services in support of the 1st French Army's operations during its time in the Flanders sector of Belgium. On 3 January 1918, Park and his observer, Lieutenant J. Robertson, were flying near Ramicourt on a photo reconnaissance when they were engaged by several German Albatros fighters. Park was able to send one Albatros out of control although his observer's gun jammed. Park eventually evaded the pursuing fighters, although his engine was damaged by machine-gun fire and he force landed behind British lines. He was then sent to England for a rest; this proved to be brief for later in January he was posted to Hooton Park to instruct Canadian trainee pilots.

=== Squadron command ===
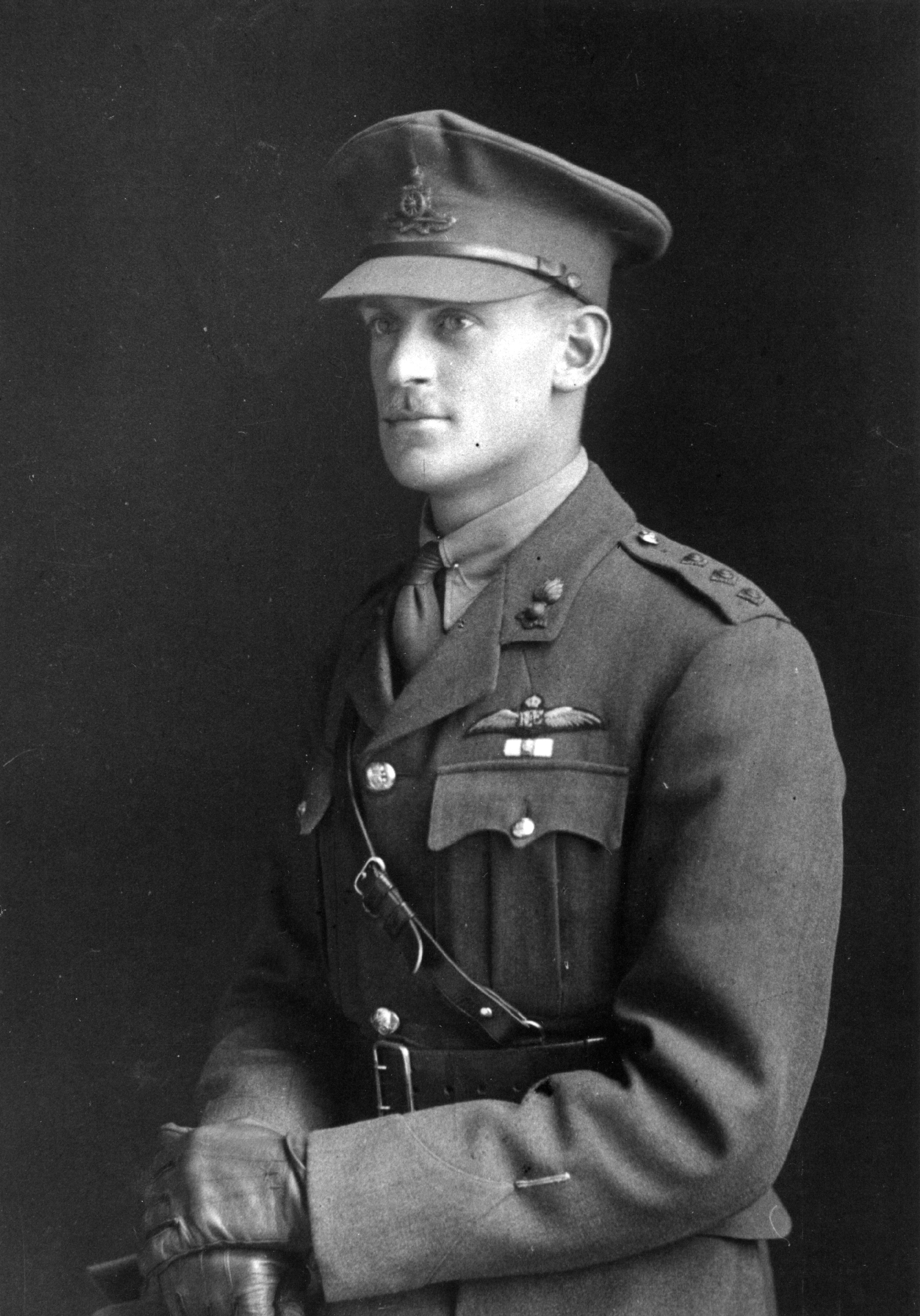
Park in his Royal Flying Corps uniform

Following the commencement of the German spring offensive in late March 1918, Park returned to France as a major to take command of No. 48 Squadron. By this time he was the only surviving pilot from its 1917 ranks. The first few days of his tenure were marked by relocations, as the squadron repeatedly retreated to new sites to stay ahead of the advancing Germans. It eventually settled in at Bertangles, where it remained for some time. Park was well respected by his men, though he tended to avoid close relationships with those under his command.

The squadron carried out low-level attacks on German troops and positions, as well as its regular reconnaissance work. The Bristol Fighter was unsuited to the former role, having limited maneuverability at low altitude. At one point in the later stages of the German advance, the squadron was reduced to three operational aircraft, the rest having been damaged or destroyed by ground fire. On 18 May, he and his observer engaged a Pfalz D.III, driving it out of control near Bray. The following month, on 25 June, flying with Second Lieutenant H. Knowles, he destroyed a Rumpler reconnaissance aircraft, and sent a DFW C.V out of control.

In August Park was wounded during a bombing raid on his squadron's airfield at Bertangles, but managed to help other injured men escape from burning hangars. By November, the strain of command had all but exhausted Park. On 9 November, in a fatigued state, he crashed a Bristol during a test flight. Two days later, the war ended. There is some confusion regarding the number of aerial victories Park achieved during the course of the war; official documentation of No. 48 Squadron states that he and his observers were credited with destroying 9 and sending 11 out of control, a total of 20 German aircraft. Records in the Air Ministry credit him with 14 aerial victories. Park's biographer Vincent Orange considered that Park definitely destroyed 11 aircraft and damaged, if not destroyed, 13 others.

== Interwar period ==
Just after the war, on 25 November 1918, Park married Dorothy "Dol" Parish at Christ Church in Lancaster Gate. The two had met in October 1917 when Park stayed at the home of a fellow pilot while on leave in London. Parish, born in London, was a nurse during the war. Park had applied for a permanent commission in the Royal Air Force (RAF) earlier in the year, but heard nothing despite his application having the support of his wing commander. For the time being, he was posted to command of No. 54 Training Depot at Fairlop, but was deemed fit only for light flying and ground duties. In February 1919 he applied again for a permanent commission in the RAF. The same month his father made an application on Park's behalf to the Minister of Defence in New Zealand for a possible role in the military aviation service that had been proposed for the country's defence. This proved to be fruitless as a firm decision regarding the service was not made. In the meantime Park also sought employment with a New Zealand firm, the Canterbury Aviation Company formed by Henry Wigram, a pioneer of commercial aviation in the country. Park was overlooked for the role.

Park went to London Colney to command the training depot there and also went on a course at the No. 2 School of Navigation and Bomb Dropping. In late April, together with a Captain Stewart, he flew a Handley Page 0/400 twin-engined bomber on a 1,880-mile (3,030 km) circuit of the British Isles, completing the flight in 28 hours, 30 minutes. It was the second such flight of its type, designed to foster public awareness of the RAF. The following month, Park had a medical examination which raised concerns about his health owing to his war wounds, as well as nervous and cardiovascular issues. He was deemed to be unfit for further service, notwithstanding the record flight he had just made. Park took leave for rest and two months later sought a re-examination. This graded him fit for ground duties although he was still not able to fly. In the meantime, he was awarded the Distinguished Flying Cross "in recognition of distinguished services rendered during the war".

Park was granted his permanent commission in September, with effect from 1 August 1919, with the rank of flight lieutenant. He was appointed commander of a store of Handley Page aircraft at Hawkinge. The role did not satisfy him and he was pleased when, in early 1920, he was posted to the newly reformed No. 25 Squadron as a flight commander. At the time, it was the only fighter squadron based in the United Kingdom. Later that year he took command of the School of Technical Training, based at Manston, and was subsequently promoted to squadron leader. His health also improved. In April 1922 he was one of twenty officers selected to attend the newly formed RAF Staff College at Andover. Fellow students on the 12-month course included Sholto Douglas, with whom he had clashed the previous year over arrangements for flight demonstrations at an air show, and Charles Portal, both of whom would go on to serve as Chief of the Air Staff (CAS).

=== Staff officer ===
In March 1923, Park's health was sufficiently restored that he was returned to flight status and two months later he was posted to Egypt on technical duties. Based at Aboukir, he was accompanied by his wife and the couple's young son. Later in the year, he transferred to Cairo as a technical staff officer at the headquarters of RAF Middle East Command. In October 1924 he was switched to air staff duties. He became well respected by his commander, Oliver Swann, who advocated for him in 1925 when concerns were raised regarding Park's health. In June 1926, Park and his family, which now included a second son, returned to England. A medical examination at this time graded him fit for duty.

At the behest of an acquaintance, Air Commodore Felton Holt, Park was posted to the Air Defence of Great Britain (ADGB) in August. He was to serve on the staff of the commander of the ADGB, Air Marshal Sir John Salmond, with responsibility for "Operations, Intelligence Mobilization and Combined Training". The ADGB, based at Uxbridge, was a RAF command tasked with the air defence of the United Kingdom, and Park was given considerable latitude in developing his role. After 15 months with the ADGB, Park was given a squadron command; he proceeded to Duxford to lead No. 111 Squadron, a fighter unit. It operated the Armstrong Whitworth Siskin and Park ensured that the squadron worked extensively, routinely recording high flying hours during his tenure in command. He was involved in an incident on 7 February 1928, when he crashed a Siskin while landing at night. In the ensuing investigation, he conceded his night vision was flawed and thereafter did not fly at night.

Park was promoted to wing commander on 1 January 1929 and posted back to Uxbridge on staff duties two months later. For two years running he helped in the organisation of the air pageants at Hendon, which drew over 100,000 spectators, and he was also involved in the development of systems for controlling the operations of fighter aircraft defending the United Kingdom from aerial attacks. His senior officer at this time was Air Vice Marshal Hugh Dowding. In January 1931, Park was given command of the RAF station at Northolt, his tenure lasting 18 months. He then became chief instructor at the Oxford University Air Squadron (OUAS). Park was responsible for 75 students, among them Archibald Hope, who later commanded No. 601 Squadron. Hope regarded Park as a good commander of the OUAS, as did a junior instructor, the future flying ace Tom Gleave. Many of the students at OUAS, encouraged by Park, would go on to join the RAF. He was subsequently awarded an honorary Master of Arts degree by Oxford University in recognition of his services.

=== South America ===
In November 1934, Park was dispatched to Buenos Aires to serve as the Air Attaché for South America. A key part of his role was to facilitate local interest in British aircraft. He had been given notice of his appointment some months before, affording him time to learn Spanish. He was accompanied by his wife but their two children remained in England, attending boarding schools. Park's wife Dol had longstanding connections to Argentina, as members of her family had held diplomatic postings in the country. Soon after his arrival he was promoted to group captain. He travelled throughout the continent, visiting aircraft factories and air bases, and promoting British aircraft, military and civilian. The work was challenging as American aircraft manufacturers dominated the scene and he was not helped by the Air Ministry's commitment to expanding the RAF in preference to making aircraft sales to other countries. The skills he learnt in the role, ranging from mixing with military personnel of all ranks to rapid inspections of air bases, proved beneficial in the future.

=== Fighter Command ===
Park was appointed Air Aide-de-Camp to King George VI in early 1937. By this time, he had returned to the United Kingdom and was attending the Imperial Defence College, which was close to Buckingham Palace. The course at the Imperial Defence College was designed to enhance the knowledge of its students, mostly senior officers from the British armed forces, in staff, diplomacy and political matters. Park became known for being a questioning student, and demanding of guest lecturers. At the end of the year, he took command of the RAF station at Tangmere, which was home to two fighter squadrons and a bomber unit. In April 1938, he became ill with streptococcal pharyngitis; this prevented him from taking up his next posting in Palestine, which instead went to Arthur Harris, future leader of Bomber Command. Park, after a period of rest, took the position that had been intended for Harris: Senior Air Staff Officer (SASO) to Hugh Dowding, the commander of Fighter Command, which had been formed in July 1936, after the ADGB was split up. (Note: The structure of the ADGB had been deemed unwieldy and awkward to manage, leading to the decision to split it into separate commands.)

Park took up his new appointment in May, and this coincided with a promotion to air commodore. He was now based at Bentley Priory, second-in-command to Dowding. The pair worked towards the development of an operational defence system for the United Kingdom, the first of its type in the world. This involved improving the operational efficiency of Fighter Command and the integration of radio direction finding (RDF) techniques into the tactical handling of fighters to counter incoming bombers. A key improvement made by Park in the control of RAF fighters over the southeast of England was better vetting of data that made it to the plotting tables on which movement of both friendly and enemy aircraft were shown. Dowding had been resistant to Park's suggestion to filter out some data but became convinced of its merits when Park conducted unauthorised trials and showed the results to Dowding. The plotting tables, now less cluttered, made for more effective decision making.

With Dowding's blessing, Park also worked on an air tactics manual for Fighter Command. As part of this he recommended replacing the rifle-calibre machine guns on the Hawker Hurricane and Supermarine Spitfire fighters with heavy machine guns, but was overruled. He was also against the use of the conventional "Vic" formation used by the RAF, in which three fighter aircraft flew in a V-formation, on the basis that these were not suited for monoplanes and wanted to explore alternatives. Despite his efforts the Air Ministry maintained its existing approach to fighter tactics.

== Second World War ==
Following the outbreak of the Second World War, Park supported Dowding in his efforts to retain as many fighter aircraft as possible for the air defence of the United Kingdom. This was despite the requests for fighter squadrons to support the British Expeditionary Force (BEF) dispatched to France shortly after the commencement of hostilities. During the Phoney War, there was great urgency in developing and implementing tactics for the defence of British airspace, through coordination of data collected from RDF stations, the Observer Corps, and the fighters themselves.

On 20 April 1940 Park took over from Air Vice Marshal William Welsh as commander of No. 11 Group, responsible for the fighter defence of London and southeast England. Promoted to acting air vice marshal the previous month, he had only just recovered from an emergency appendectomy. Park's appointment affronted Air Vice Marshal Trafford Leigh-Mallory, the commander of neighbouring No. 12 Group, which covered the Midlands. Park had greater experience with fighters, and most of Leigh-Mallory's career, aside from the three years that he had spent in charge of No. 12 Group, was in training roles. There were already tensions between Park and Leigh-Mallory; in exercises carried out in the summer of 1939, No. 12 Group had not performed as expected and Park, on behalf of Dowding, raised concerns in this respect.

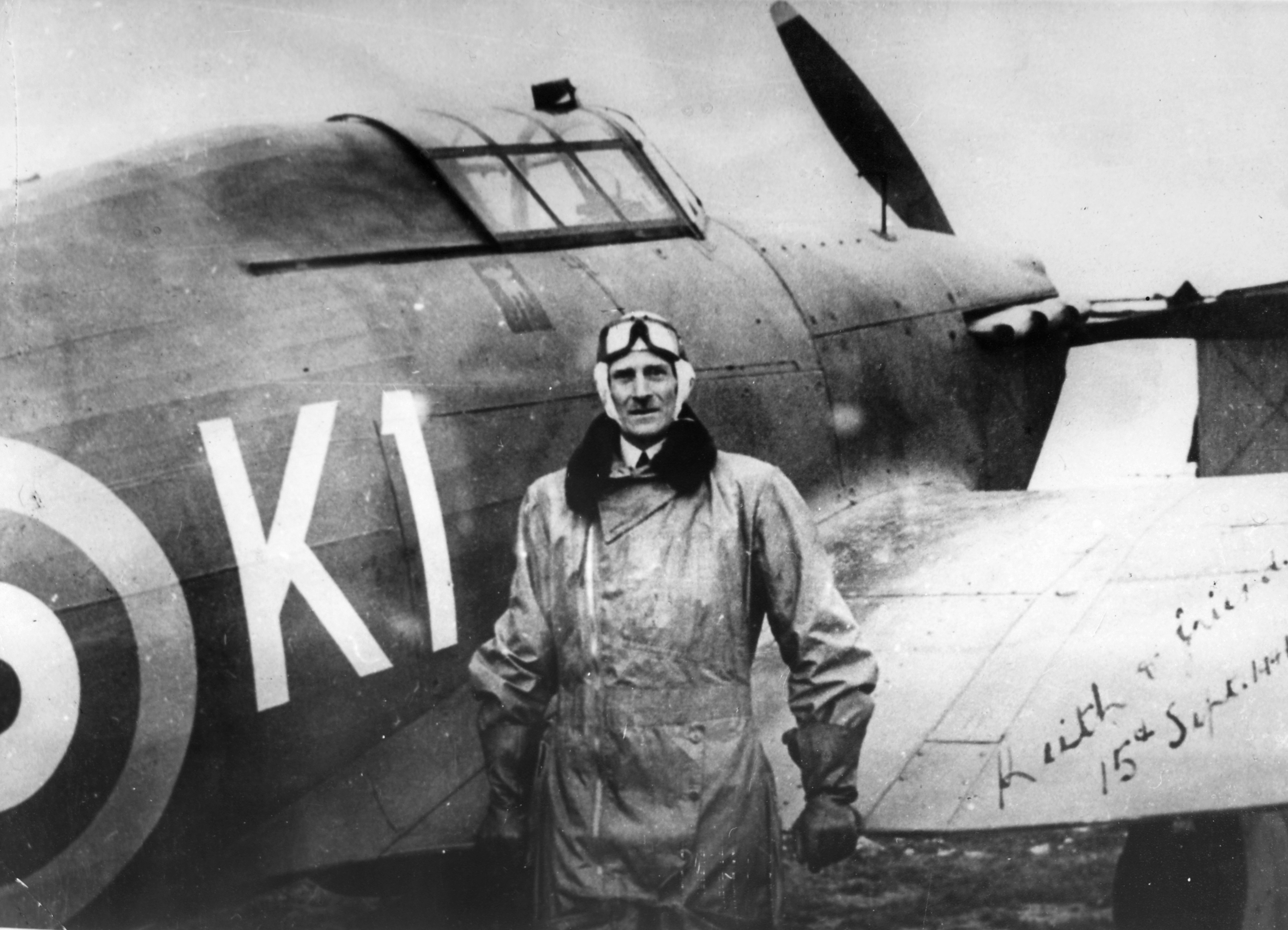
Park and the Hurricane he regularly flew in 1940–41

=== Dunkirk ===
At the time Park took command of No. 11 Group, it was perceived that Leigh-Mallory's No. 12 Group would bear the brunt of the German bombing campaign since this area of the British Isles was the closest to Germany. The subsequent invasion of the Low Countries on 10 May changed the threat level for the southeast of England. By 24 May the majority of the BEF, along with French and Belgian troops, had been pushed back and became encircled at Dunkirk. During the subsequent Dunkirk evacuation, codenamed Operation Dynamo, No. 11 Group provided air cover under Park's direction. The RAF fighters were disadvantaged, having to operate over 50 miles (80 km) from their bases in the southeast of England and without the benefit of radar coverage. At best, they had about 40 minutes flying time over Dunkirk.

Park operated patrol lines over Dunkirk on 27 May, the first day of the evacuation, but the RAF fighters were heavily outnumbered. They were unable to prevent the bombing of Dunkirk itself, but were able to provide some limited protection of the moles and ships. The following day, under orders from the CAS, Air Chief Marshal Cyril Newall, fighters attempted to provide continuous coverage throughout the day but were unable to do so due to their relatively limited numbers. Park advocated for the usage of at least two squadrons at a time in stronger patrols rather than the continuous coverage. This was based on his own observations from flying his personal Hurricane over Dunkirk. His approach was put into effect the next day, sometimes using as many as four squadrons, with greater intervals between patrols. Although there was some pressure from Newall and Churchill for a stronger RAF presence over the beachhead, Dowding sheltered Park from this influence and left him to his work. In the later stages of Operation Dynamo, which ended on 4 June, weather and the pressure from the advancing Germans forced the evacuation efforts to be concentrated on the times around dawn and dusk, and Park's fighters were able to operate more effectively.

Throughout this period, Park not only flew his Hurricane to Dunkirk to see the situation for himself, but also visited RAF airfields and met personnel, both pilots and groundcrew. He was very recognisable, wearing white overalls when flying. This helped foster his reputation within No. 11 Group. He also maintained a desire to switch to the offensive; just two weeks after Dunkirk, he sought to have some Hurricane squadrons refitted as fighter-bombers and used, along with Bristol Blenheims, to make nighttime attack on the German airfields in France. Dowding did not approve.

=== Battle of Britain ===
At the commencement of the Battle of Britain, Fighter Command had 58 squadrons spread across four fighter groups. As well as Park's No. 11 Group and Leigh-Mallory's No. 12 Group, these included No. 10 Group, which covered the southwest of England, and No. 13 Group, covering the north of England and Scotland. Being responsible for the south-eastern England area, including London, No. 11 Group faced the bulk of the Luftwaffe's air strength, at least 1,000 bombers and 400 fighters. To counter this, Park had at his disposal 350 fighters across 22 fighter squadrons and just over 550 pilots. He was also able to draw upon the neighbouring groups for reinforcements as required. Park directed that the fighter squadrons under his control be scrambled against incoming German bombers with the aim of attacking them before they reached their targets, and that engaging fighter escorts should be avoided.

Using the plotting tables at his headquarters at Uxbridge, Park had to assess which raids were a real threat and which were intended to draw away RAF fighters. Timing was important; incoming raids needed to be intercepted before reaching their targets. An understanding of what aircraft were available was also critical. He needed to ensure that there were as many as possible in the air to counter the German bombers and to avoid having too many on the ground being refuelled and rearmed. Even with the benefit of radar, Park was still disadvantaged. He usually had only around 20 minutes from when radar detected the buildup of the incoming bombers over the Pas de Calais or Cotentin regions to scramble his squadrons and have them at a suitable height for interception. To help remedy this disadvantage, he often directed his squadrons to take off in a direction away from the oncoming bombers so as to maximise the time they had to gain the necessary altitude to attack.

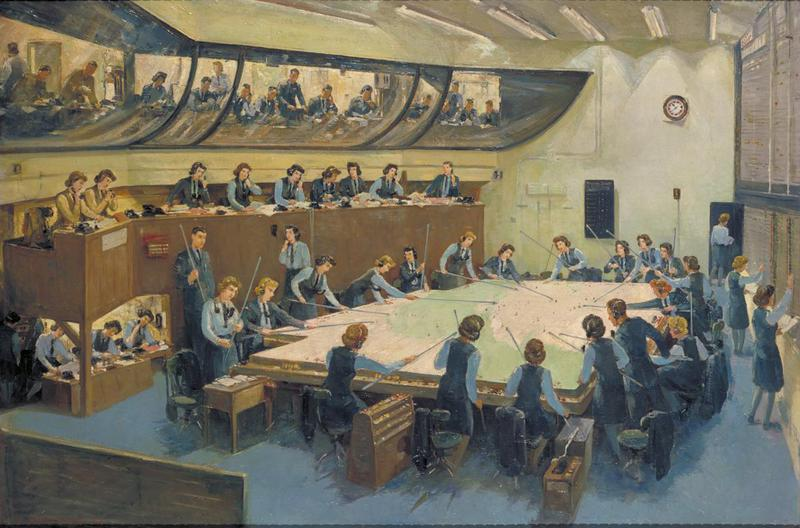
A painting by the British war artist Charles Cundall of the operations room at the headquarters of No. 11 Group in Uxbridge

At the start of the Battle of Britain, generally deemed by British historians to be 10 July (German sources usually cite a date in August), the Luftwaffe's initial focus was to gain air superiority over the English Channel, before moving to strike targets inland of the coastline. Its targets were shipping convoys moving through the Channel as well as the ports in the south of England. It was not until 1 August, when Adolf Hitler ordered the invasion of Britain, that the Luftwaffe escalated its aerial operations, with a view to the invasion commencing in late September. At this time the coastal radar stations were targeted, as well as airfields and aircraft manufacturing facilities. This placed further pressure on Park and how he dispersed his fighter squadrons. An added issue was the drain on pilots through combat losses and their replacements being inadequately trained. This was somewhat compensated for by transferring flying personnel from squadrons in the other Fighter Command Groups and volunteers from the Fleet Air Arm. He kept in regular contact with his squadrons, often flying his Hurricane to the airfields and addressing those under his command. These visits were important for morale, particularly for those airfields that had been bombed by the Luftwaffe. According to his flying logbook, he made at least one operational sortie, on 10 July, to see a shipping convoy during a visit to Lympne airfield.

On 16 August, following a visit to Park's headquarters at Uxbridge, Winston Churchill made a speech in which he recited one of his most famous lines, referring to RAF fighter pilots: "Never in the field of human conflict has so much been owed by so many to so few". Churchill, who thought well of Park, made another visit to Uxbridge the following month, on 15 September. His visit coincided with the Luftwaffe's greatest daytime raid on England. Churchill noted the many incoming German aircraft but was reassured with Park's calm reply that RAF forces would meet them. He put up all his aircraft, leaving no reserve, and they were joined by 60 fighters from No. 12 Group. It was the first time that the RAF and the Luftwaffe met in nearly equal numbers. The German attack was a significant failure and an even larger raid mounted later in the afternoon was also unsuccessful. The date of 15 September subsequently became known as Battle of Britain Day. On the grounds that the Luftwaffe had not yet achieved dominance in the air, Hitler consequently postponed the scheduled invasion of England but this would not become clear to the British for several more weeks.

Earlier in September, the Luftwaffe had switched from attacking the RAF airfields to London itself. The Germans believed that Fighter Command was largely exhausted but the change in tactics was welcomed as both Park and Dowding recognised that it would be a relief for their pilots. At one stage the previous month, pilots and fighters were being lost at a greater rate than they could be replaced and Park had to close Biggin Hill, which had been rendered nonoperational due to bomb damage. The Luftwaffe's shift to targeting London gave Park valuable breathing space to rebuild his damaged airfields. He also changed his own tactics, using his squadrons to intercept the German bombers and fighters making their way back to France after bombing London. Park later remarked to Alan Mitchell, a New Zealand journalist: "The Hun lost the Battle of Britain when he switched from bombing my fighter-stations to bombing London...". Despite the change in tactics, No. 11 Group was still under pressure. It operated standing patrols to be ready to intercept incoming raids, which were now coming in at higher altitudes. It was therefore more difficult to make out whether such raids were bombers or just a large fighter sweep; Park sought to avoid engagement with the latter. He endeavoured to keep his pilots fresh and rested, arranging for improved facilities and billets away from areas being bombed.

==== Big Wings controversy ====
As the Battle of Britain progressed, Park had increasing concerns about Leigh-Mallory's handling of No. 12 Group. Often, Park's airfields were left exposed to attack while his squadrons were in the air so he and his controllers made requests to No. 12 Group for cover. In No. 12 Group, Leigh-Mallory encouraged the use of "Big Wings"; this involved assembling three or more squadrons in a formation before they were directed towards approaching German bombers. This took time and often by the time the Big Wing was assembled, the bombers had already attacked their targets and were on their way back to their bases in France. Leigh-Mallory believed that this was justified as the assembled Big Wing would theoretically inflict significant losses on the departing bombers.

On several occasions in August, protection was requested from No. 12 Group for Park's airfields at North Weald, Manston and Hornchurch, but they were still bombed due to the time taken to assemble the Big Wing. This led Park to claim to his sector controllers that Leigh-Mallory was negligent in his responsibilities. Park eventually resorted to directing his requests for cover by No. 12 Group through Fighter Command Headquarters for greater responsiveness.

Park was not opposed to the use of squadrons en masse and had used comparable tactics while defending the evacuation of the beaches at Dunkirk a few months previously. He recognised that the short time between the detection of the approaching German bombers and them reaching their targets in southeast England meant that Big Wings were not practical. Park preferred greater control over individual squadrons. This allowed him to be more responsive to changes in tactics by the Luftwaffe which might, for example, send one group of bombers to a certain target as a diversion to draw in RAF fighters while another group of bombers attacked the actual target.

A report that Leigh-Mallory had sent to the Air Ministry, which inflated claims made by No. 12 Group when operating the Big Wing, had found a receptive audience at senior levels of the RAF. Park sent his own report on recent operations during the August–September period, which included critical comments on the Air Ministry's efforts in repairing damaged airfields. These complaints were poorly received. Underlying this was increasing tensions between Dowding and the Air Ministry over Fighter Command's ability to deal with the Luftwaffe's night bombing campaign. Sholto Douglas, the deputy CAS, felt Dowding was not dealing adequately with the situation.

On 17 October Dowding and Park attended a meeting, chaired by Douglas, to discuss fighter tactics at the Air Ministry in London. (Note: Newall, the CAS, who had called the meeting, was ill and was in the final days of his appointment.) Senior RAF personnel were present, including Leigh-Mallory but so was the relatively junior officer, Squadron Leader Douglas Bader, a firm advocate for the Big Wing. Neither Park nor Dowding had expected this nor thought to invite an officer with a contrary frontline experience. Park, who to some attendees appeared fatigued, found himself having to justify his interception methods and explain why the Big Wing was not an appropriate tactic for his area of operations. Leigh-Mallory countered, stating his desire to help No. 11 Group and promising good response times for assembly of the Big Wing. In the absence of any protest from Dowding, Douglas approved the use of Big Wings over No. 11 Group's area of operations. The tactic was used by No. 12 Group for the rest of October but remained relatively ineffective, being too slow to get to where they were needed. Park continued to raise complaints about the use of Big Wings but Douglas saw this as being a personal objection to No. 12 Group operating in his sector.

=== Relief ===
By late October, it was clear that the Luftwaffe's operations were lacking the intensity of previous months and, by the end of the month, the Battle of Britain was deemed to be over. Park's mind turned to the commencement of offensive operations and he made proposals to attack the German airfields in France, identifying that these were vulnerable to surprise attacks prior to sunset. Dowding overruled him, although Douglas was receptive to the proposal. On 7 December, Park was replaced as commander of No. 11 Group, his successor being Leigh-Mallory. The decision had been made late the previous month. Officially, this was because Park needed a rest from the stress of the past several months. Park believed his relief was due to the dispute with Leigh-Mallory.

Historian John Ray, in his account of Dowding's handling of the Battle of Britain, argues that Park was seen at the Air Ministry as being closely aligned with Dowding, implementing the latter's defensive scheme. Dowding, already overdue for his retirement, had been released from his post on 17 November and, once he went, Park had to follow to enable a fresh start at Fighter Command. Douglas took over Fighter Command and Leigh-Mallory No. 11 Group. According to Park, on his final day at No. 11 Group, he had to formally brief Leigh-Mallory's SASO, rather than Leigh-Mallory himself who, contrary to custom, was not present for the changeover in command.

On learning of Park's impending departure, Air Vice Marshal Richard Saul, who led No. 13 Group, wrote to Park and noted "the magnificent achievements of your group in the past six months; they have borne the brunt of the war, and undoubtedly saved England". Arthur Tedder, a future CAS, later said of Park's command of No. 11 Group: "If ever any one man won the Battle of Britain, he did. I don't believe it is realised how much that one man, with his leadership, his calm judgement and his skill, did to save not only this country, but the world." Park himself felt that Saul should have taken over No. 11 Group instead of Leigh-Mallory, on the basis that the former was much more familiar with the RAF stations in the area. The news of Park's dismissal was met with dismay among his command. Wing Commander Victor Beamish, in charge of North Weald station, wrote to Park, advising that the regret at his departure crossed all ranks. Group Captain Cecil Bouchier, another senior officer within No. 11 Group, considered Park's leadership "...by his own infinite efforts...would not only ensure ultimate victory but inspire it". Subsequent appraisals of Park by German military intelligence were that he was a "man of action", and was known as the "Defender of London". (Note: The German appraisal of Leigh-Mallory was less flattering; he was known as "The Flying Sergeant" on account of his perceived preoccupation with administrative matters and tight control of subordinates.)

Shortly after his relief, on 17 December, it was publicly announced that Park had been appointed a Companion of the Order of the Bath. According to the citation in The London Gazette, the honour was "in recognition of distinguished services rendered in recent operations". Despite this, Park was angry at his treatment by the Air Ministry and his opinion as to the reason for his relief was reinforced by comments from colleagues that unofficial reports had been made about Park's poor relationship with Leigh-Mallory. Late the following year he wrote to the new CAS, Air Chief Marshal Charles Portal, who had made the decision to replace Park with Leigh-Mallory, arguing his case. Portal promptly replied with assurances that his decision had nothing to do with Leigh-Mallory and was simply a matter of Park's health. Churchill was angered at the treatment of Park, and Dowding, by the Air Ministry's publication in March 1941 of a pamphlet on the Battle of Britain, in which neither officer was mentioned. A subsequent republication of the pamphlet, in an illustrated form, remedied this omission.

=== Training Command ===
Declining an assignment to the Air Ministry, Park was posted to Training Command, taking charge of No. 23 Group. His command, centred on RAF South Cerney, encompassed seven service flying training schools, the Central Flying School at Upavon, and the School of Air Navigation at St Athan. It was later expanded with the addition of the Aeroplane and Armament Experimental Establishment and the Blind Approach Development Unit, both at RAF Boscombe Down. When he arrived at his command on 27 December, he immediately noted deficiencies in its procedures as it had not moved to a wartime footing. Some within No. 23 Group appeared unaware of the urgent need for trained pilots during the Battle of Britain.

Park moved immediately to remedy the situation. As he had at No. 11 Group, Park regularly flew himself to the stations under his command. Within a month of his arrival, he had visited each unit at least once, seeing for himself their state of readiness. He improved operational efficiencies, introduced new equipment, and modernised airfields. At times he found within Training Command a cultural resistance to change that he had to overcome.

By the end of 1941, overseas training establishments were coming on line and Park was looking to a potential return to frontline duties. In December, he was given a posting to Iraq as Air Officer Commanding (AOC). In a matter of days this changed, and he instead proceeded to Egypt to become AOC there. In his new role, he was responsible for the aerial defence of the Nile Delta region, duties that were similar to those he performed as commander of No. 11 Group, although he now had night fighters under his control. The Luftwaffe, flying from bases in the Greek islands, became more aggressive in its operations against targets in Egypt, threatening the buildup of Allied forces in the region. Park was able to improve the efficiency and coordination of Egypt's defences and deal better with incoming bombing raids.

=== Malta ===
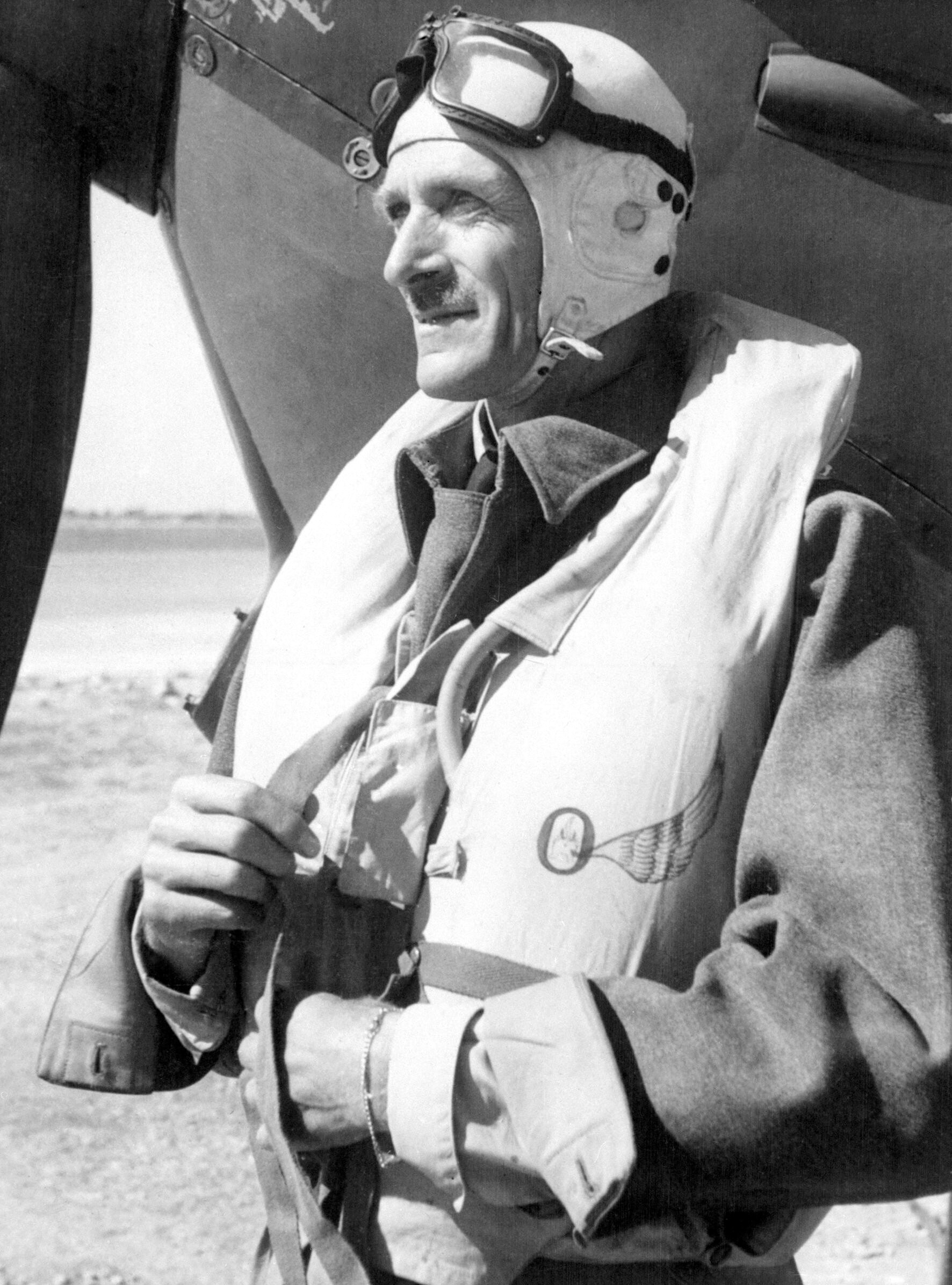
Park in front of his Hurricane on Malta

On 8 July 1942, Park relinquished command in Egypt and six days later went to Malta to replace Hugh Lloyd, the RAF commander on the island, which was under siege by the Axis powers. It was felt that Park's experience of fighter defence operations was needed. Arriving by flying boat, he landed in the middle of a raid, although Lloyd had specifically requested he circle the harbour until it had passed. Lloyd met Park and admonished him for taking unnecessary risks in landing.

Park abandoned the defensive approach taken by Lloyd, in which the island's fighters took off, circled behind the approaching bombers of the Axis forces and engaged them over Malta. Park, having plenty of Spitfires on hand, sought to intercept and break up the German and Italian bomber formations before they reached Malta. One squadron would endeavour to engage the fighters providing high cover for the bombers, another would deal with the closer escorting fighters and the third would seek out the bombers directly.

Using these tactics, similar what had been employed by his No. 11 Group during the Battle of Britain, Park believed that it would be more likely that the enemy would be shot down or abort their objectives. His forces began implementing what Park called his Forward Interception Plan on 25 July. It was immediately successful and, within a week, daylight raids had ceased. The Axis response was to send in fighter sweeps at even higher altitudes to gain the tactical advantage. Park responded by ordering his fighters to climb no higher than 6,100 feet (1,900 m). This conceded a considerable height advantage to the opposing fighters, but forced them to engage the Spitfires at altitudes more suitable for the latter.

By September the Axis's aerial operations against Malta were on the decline and the British regained air superiority over the island. RAF bomber and torpedo squadrons soon returned to Malta in anticipation of offensive operations against German forces in North Africa. Park dispatched Hurricane fighter bombers, fitted with extra fuel tanks, to attack Axis supply lines as far away as Egypt. Vickers Wellington medium bombers and Bristol Beaufort torpedo bombers attacked ports, shipping and airfields, disrupting the Axis supply routes. In October, the Axis resumed its bomber offensive against the island; resistance was more effective using Park's tactics although some bombers still managed to attack targets on Malta.

With supplies more regularly getting through to Malta, offensive operations in support of the Allied campaign in North Africa increased under Park's direction. More bombers arrived and these attacked targets in Algeria ahead of Operation Torch and, later, in Tunisia. There were also sorties against targets in Sicily and Sardinia. On 27 November, Park's appointment as a Knight Commander of the Order of the British Empire was announced. This was "in recognition of distinguished services in the campaign in the Middle East". At times his relations with senior officials on Malta were testy; Vice Admiral Power described Park as "unsatisfactory to deal with". Park's work was praised by the American Lieutenant General Dwight Eisenhower and British Lieutenant General Bernard Montgomery, appreciative of the RAF's operations from Malta in support of their ground forces in North Africa.

Operations of RAF forces in Malta against Sicily became increasingly important into 1943; the Italian island was a major departure point for shipping taking supplies to the Axis forces in Tunisia. By the end of May, Park had 600 modern aircraft under his control, three times what he had at the start of the year. RAF facilities on Malta had also undergone significant expansion in anticipation of the island serving as a major airbase in support of an Allied offensive against Italy. This began with the invasion of Sicily on 10 July, a campaign lasting less than six weeks. Before its commencement, Park arranged the construction of a control room at Malta. From here, he directed operations of the aircraft under his command, which amounted to 40 squadrons based at Malta, Gozo and Pantelleria.

In September, Park went to London on leave and, while there, agitated for a new posting. Portal, still the CAS, thought that Park could become head of the Northwest African Tactical Air Force, replacing another New Zealander, Arthur Coningham. Air Chief Marshal Arthur Tedder, commander of Mediterranean Air Command, preferred another candidate. Park was then slated to go to India as the air officer in charge of administration, but when the proposed appointment went to Churchill for approval, he preferred Park remain where he was for the time being.

=== Middle East ===
In January 1944, Park was promoted to air marshal and appointed air officer commander-in-chief of RAF Middle East Command, taking the role over from Sholto Douglas on Tedder's recommendation. Park arrived in Cairo on 6 January; his new post was subordinate to the RAF command structure for the Mediterranean and Middle East, led by Air Marshal John Slessor. Although Park's appointment was quickly criticised by Slessor, on the grounds that the RAF would lose influence in the region to the British Army, (Note: Slessor also described Park as "...a very stupid man".) little weight was placed on his views as he was known to be very opinionated on matters about which he often knew little. Portal and Tedder maintained their confidence in Park, as did Churchill. Park's duties in Cairo extended to the supervision of air operations in the eastern portion of the Mediterranean, as well as the Indian Ocean. He was also responsible for the training of RAF personnel in Egypt, Cyprus, Palestine and South Africa.

Partway through the year, Park was considered by the Australian government for command of the Royal Australian Air Force (RAAF), because of the rivalry between its de jure head, the Chief of the Air Staff, Air Vice Marshal George Jones, and Jones's nominal subordinate, Air Vice Marshal William Bostock, in charge of RAAF operations in the Pacific. The Australian Prime Minister, John Curtin, discussed the matter with Churchill and Portal in August, but to no avail. In any case, General Douglas MacArthur, the American commander of the South West Pacific Area, said it was too late in the war to make such changes. (Note: Park's biographer, Vincent Orange, argues that Park would have been more effective in promoting the interests of the RAAF than the incumbents, and less prone to being influenced by the Americans.)

=== Far East ===
In the New Year Honours, announced on 1 January 1945, Park was appointed a Knight Commander of the Order of the Bath (KCB). Soon afterwards, he was appointed Allied Air Commander, South-East Asia Command (ACSEAC); Air Vice Marshal Charles Medhurst took over Park's role at Middle East Command. ACSEAC was a sought-after posting, and Slessor had agitated for the appointment. Portal deemed Park better suited to the role, given his operational experience. After he was invested with his KCB at Buckingham Palace by King George VI on 14 February, he and his wife departed the United Kingdom for Calcutta to take up his post, replacing Air Marshal Guy Garrod. (Note: Garrod was only in the position on an interim basis due to the death of the original nominee for the role, Leigh-Mallory, who was killed in an aircraft crash the previous October while travelling to Calcutta.)

Once in his new command, one of Park's tasks was ensuring the aerial provision of General William Slim's 14th Army, which was advancing through Burma to Rangoon. Many of his aircraft were engaged for several weeks dropping over 1,900 tons of supplies on a daily basis to the advancing British troops. One of Park's concerns was the British Army's lack of urgency in repairing airfields captured by the 14th Army as it moved towards Rangoon. Bringing these into service would have allowed him to shorten the flight times for the supply aircraft flying from their bases in India. It would often take several weeks after their capture before the airfields were operational, a delay Park believed would have been much greater if not for his urging. He also maintained his longstanding practice of visiting the RAF stations of his command, despite its wide range, which extended from Kandy, where he was initially based until shifting to Singapore, northwest to Quetta, south to the Cocos Islands and Hong Kong to the northeast.

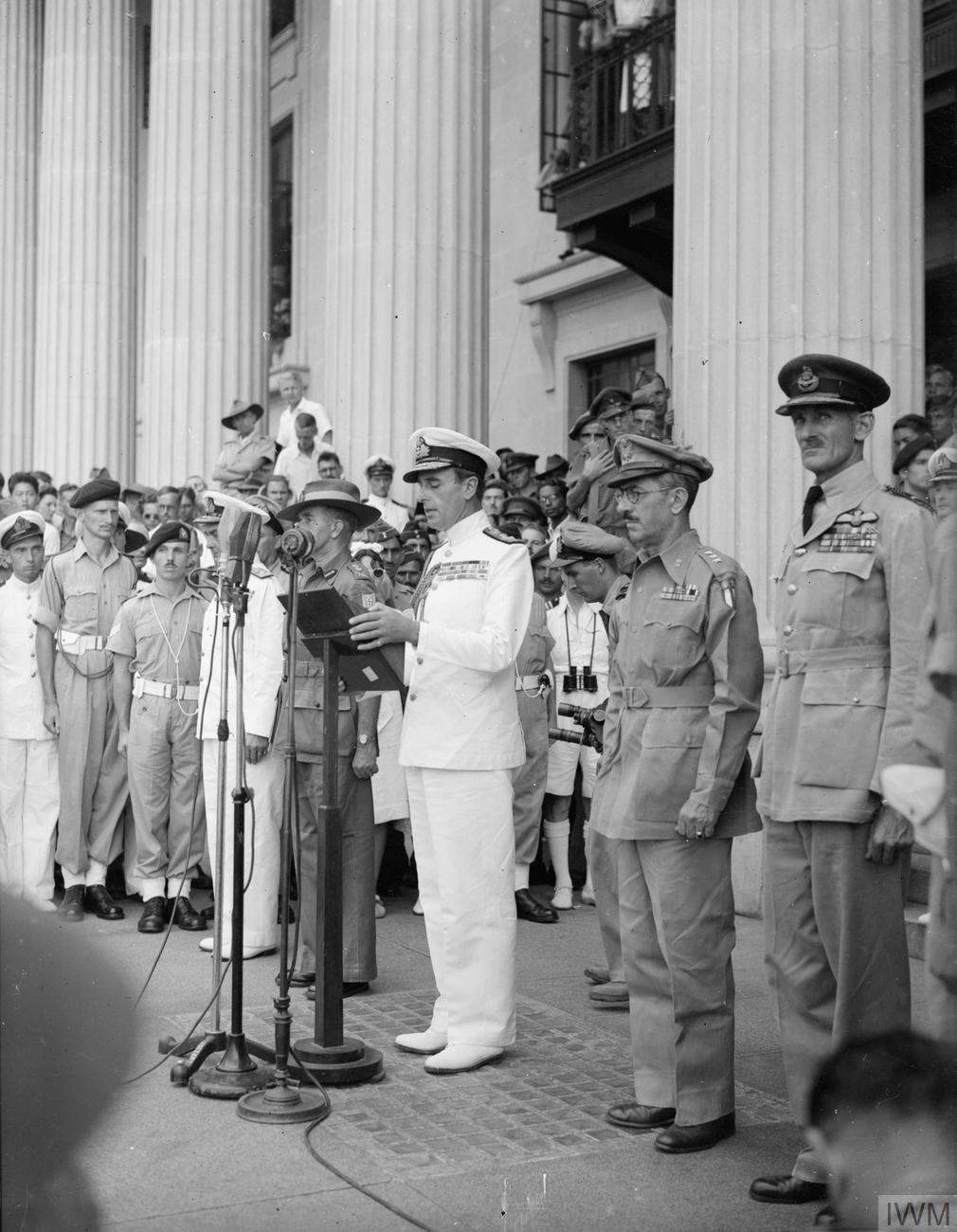
Park (far right) on the steps of the Municipal Building with Lord Mountbatten (centre, in white) following the formal surrender of the Japanese

Newly promoted to air chief marshal, on 12 September Park was present in his capacity as ACSEAC for the formal surrender of the Japanese forces in the region, the ceremony being held in Singapore. In the aftermath of the Japanese surrender, Park's duties shifted to repatriating around 125,000 Allied internees, military and civilian, from prisons in the South East Asia region. To supplement his resources for this work, he impressed Japanese aircraft and personnel into service. There was also the matter of returning British soldiers and airmen to the United Kingdom, which required coordination with Transport Command as well as his own ACSEAC. The rate of return of RAF personnel was of particular concern as a proportion were required to fly and maintain the transports; this meant that more jobs in the civilian sector were going to former soldiers and sailors. Park sought to shorten the term of service to three years for single men, and this came into effect in April 1946.

== Postwar service ==
In late November 1945, Park's headquarters transferred to Singapore, which in the postwar period was to be developed as an air base. Morale, due to the rate of repatriation of RAF personnel, continued to be a problem in the early part of the following year, and Park had to speak to several groups of dissatisfied men. Sympathetic to their concerns, he emphasised to his officers the need for pastoral care of the men under their command. Despite this, there were several instances of RAF personnel in SEAC refusing to work; as these involved conscripts, Park did not have to treat them as mutineers. In one instance, he blamed the commander of the unit for not ensuring his men's wellbeing.

Park was also engaged writing formal dispatches regarding operations carried out by SEAC. In his early drafts he was critical of the British land forces' ability to support the ground organisation required for his transport aircraft, and also emphasised the importance of air supply operations to the success achieved in the region. He toned down his writings in response to feedback from the War Office.

In February 1946, Park, looking ahead to his impending replacement as ACSEAC by his deputy, Air Marshal Guy Pirie, in late April, sought permission for leave in New Zealand before taking up his next post. Tedder advised that there was no envisaged role for Park in the RAF, preference being given to younger men. This greatly disappointed Park. For much of April, he was acting Supreme Allied Commander of South-East Asia while Lord Mountbatten was in Australia; this was the most senior command that Park held during his military career. The following month, after a recommendation by Mountbatten, Park was appointed a Knight Grand Cross of The Most Honourable Order of the Bath (GCB) "in recognition for distinguished services in South East Asia".

After recovering from a bout of dysentery, Park and his wife departed Singapore to commence their tour of New Zealand on 26 May. Park had not been to the country for over 31 years and it was the first visit for his wife. While there he saw family and friends and was the guest of honour at several civic functions throughout the country. He had been asked by the Air Ministry to meet with representatives of the RNZAF to discuss its postwar plans and needs. He reported back that there was an intention to align with the RAF on equipment and processes.

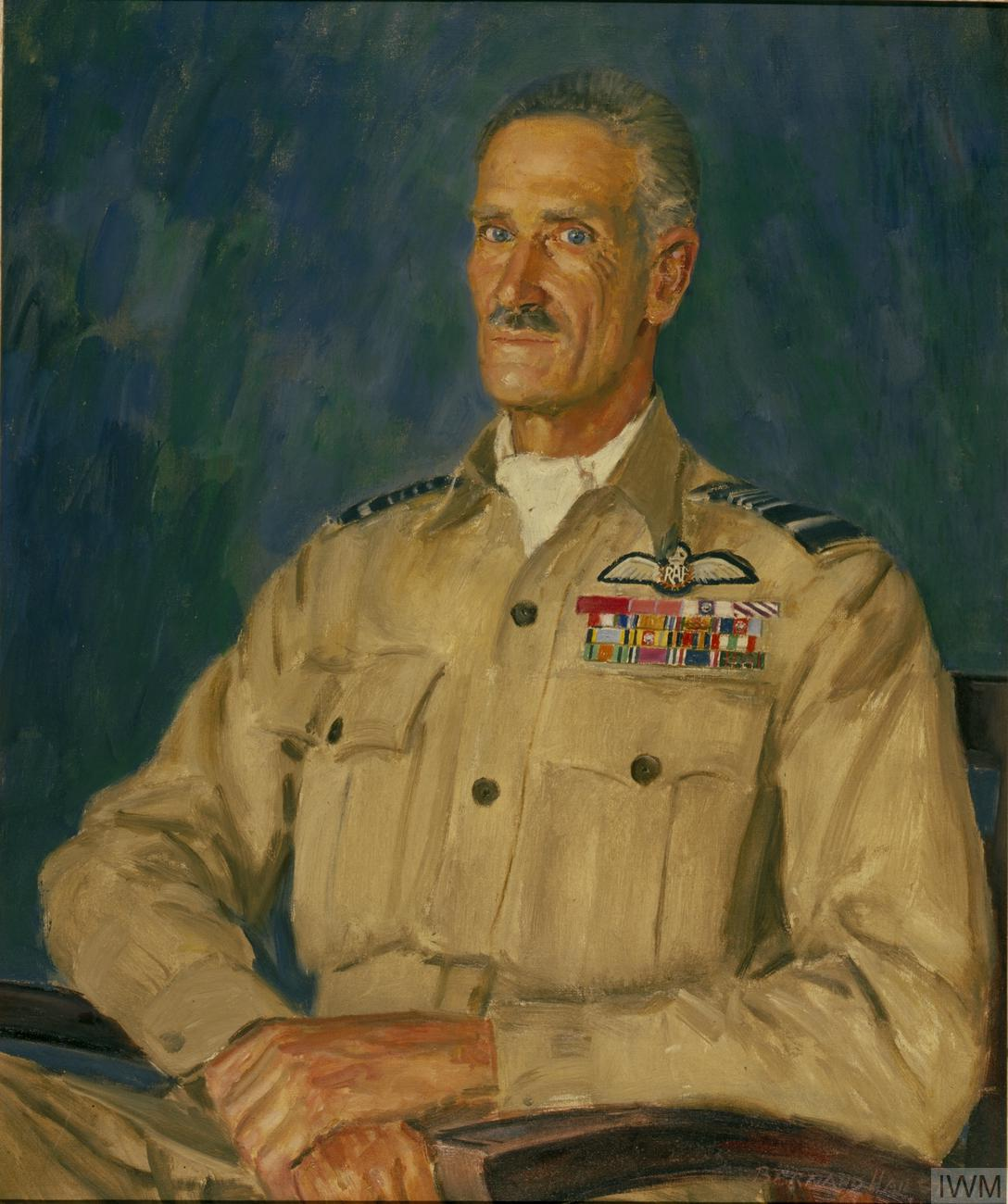
Park's portrait, executed by the official war artist Bernard Hailstone in 1945

By August, Park was back in the United Kingdom and the following month received official notice of his impending retirement from the RAF. Taking into account leave he had been granted for his overseas service, he was retired with effect from 20 December 1946 and with the rank of air chief marshal. He was not entitled to the pension that came with this rank. Despite the advocacy of Tedder, Mountbatten and Slessor, the Treasury would not pay the full amount and he instead received an amount equivalent to that due to an air marshal, plus a third of the difference between this and the pension due an air chief marshal.

One of his final official engagements was a visit to Buckingham Palace, where he received the insignia of the GCB from King George VI on 16 October. He was also recognised by the United States for his work during the Second World War, being appointed a Commander of the Legion of Merit in 1947.

== Later life ==
Almost immediately after his retirement, Park became a representative of the Hawker Siddeley Group, which manufactured military and civilian aircraft. He was tasked with selling aviation equipment to countries in South America, aided by his previous experience in the region. He met the president of Argentina, Juan Perón, in early 1947, and a contract was subsequently signed later in the year for 380 Gloster Meteor jet fighters and 30 Avro Lincoln heavy bombers. By May he was back in England before he and his wife, along with one of their two sons, went to New Zealand. There, based in Auckland, he was Hawker Siddeley's Pacific representative.

Park was largely frustrated in his efforts to sell his employer's aircraft in New Zealand as there was a preference for those made by American manufacturers. He was occasionally critical of the purchasing decisions of the New Zealand government, which embarrassed Hawker Siddeley. In one case, he noted that while some pilots of the RNZAF still had to make do with antiquated North American P-51D Mustangs and de Havilland Vampires, the air forces of less developed countries were equipped with modern Hawker Hunter jet fighters.

Park was also involved in the establishment of Auckland International Airport at Māngere. He had already highlighted the importance of such a facility to the Auckland business community. He had received feedback from Sholto Douglas, now a director of the British Overseas Airways Corporation, that New Zealand's airfields were particularly poor. In 1951, Park was named chairman of the International Airport Committee and for the next few years worked towards obtaining the necessary land and cooperation from both central and local government.

In 1951, Park's younger son Colin, a constable with the police force in British Malaya, was killed in the line of duty. Colin's death was upsetting for both parents, but Park was better able to move on with life while his wife struggled to come to terms with the loss of her son.

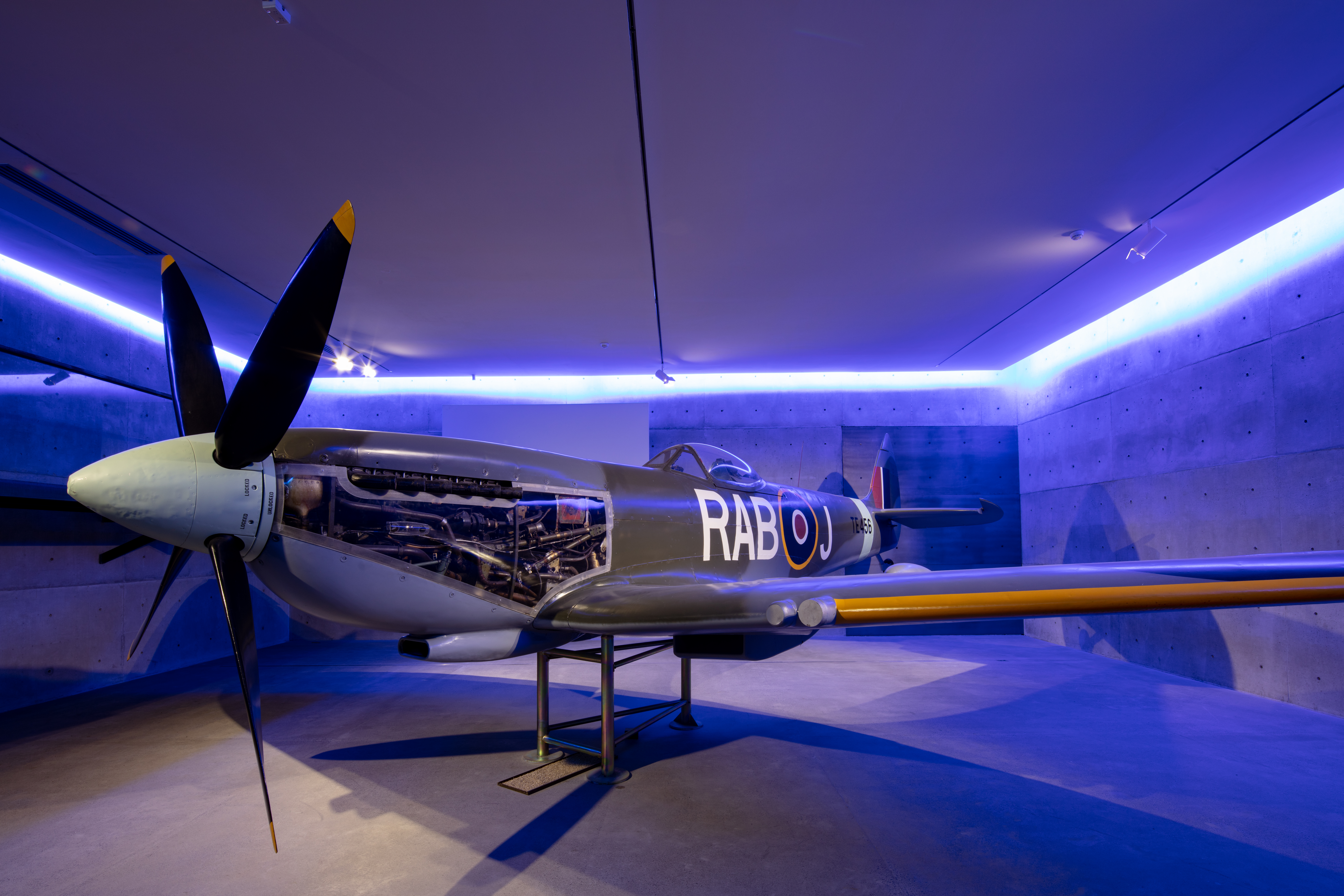
A Supermarine Spitfire on display at the Auckland War Memorial Museum; Park helped to facilitate the donation of the aircraft

In 1955, the same year that he stepped down from the International Airport Committee, Park's connections and advocacy with the Air Ministry resulted in the donation of a Spitfire to the Auckland War Memorial Museum. It was an aircraft that he personally selected while on a visit to the United Kingdom that year. The donated Spitfire, a Mk XVI, which had been used in the filming of Reach for the Sky, arrived at the museum the following year and Park gave an address at its formal unveiling. The aircraft remains on display in one of the museum's galleries.

Park's lack of diplomacy, together with his age, ultimately led to his retirement from Hawker Siddeley in June 1960. Soon afterward, encouraged by the city's mayor at the time, Sir Dove-Myer Robinson, Park stood for election for the Auckland City Council. He was elected for a three-year term in the 1962 local elections, and went on to be reelected for two more terms. As a councillor he found himself again involved with the international airport at Māngere, being on the committee supervising the construction of some of its infrastructure. The airport began international operations in 1966 and, for a time, acquaintances of Park moved to have it named after him; the government declined to do so. In the final year of his last term as councillor, his wife, Lady Dorothy, who had been unwell for some time, died.

A film of the Battle of Britain was released in 1969, based on the book The Narrow Margin by Derek Wood and Derek Dempster. Produced by Harry Saltzman, the film was intended to be an accurate representation of the battle. Before production commenced, Trevor Howard, the actor cast as Park, wrote to him with assurances of doing justice to his leadership of No. 11 Group. On viewing the finished film at its premiere in New Zealand, Park found it entertaining but noted the meeting in which he and Leigh-Mallory argued over the use of Big Wings was fictionalised and less dramatic than what had actually occurred.

== Death ==
In his later years Park suffered a series of heart attacks. He became ill in Auckland on 2 February 1975 and was admitted to hospital, where he died on 6 February, aged 82. Park was accorded a military funeral, the service being held at Holy Trinity Cathedral in Parnell. Condolences were sent by Elizabeth II and Battle of Britain pilot Johnny Kent. His remains were cremated and, at the request of his surviving son Ian, his ashes scattered over Waitemata Harbour from an aircraft.

Later that year, on 12 September, a memorial service was held in London at St Clement Danes on the Strand. One of the speakers was Douglas Bader, who during his speech noted: "British military history of this century has been enriched with the names of great fighting men from New Zealand. Keith Park's name is carved into that history alongside those of his peers."

== Legacy ==
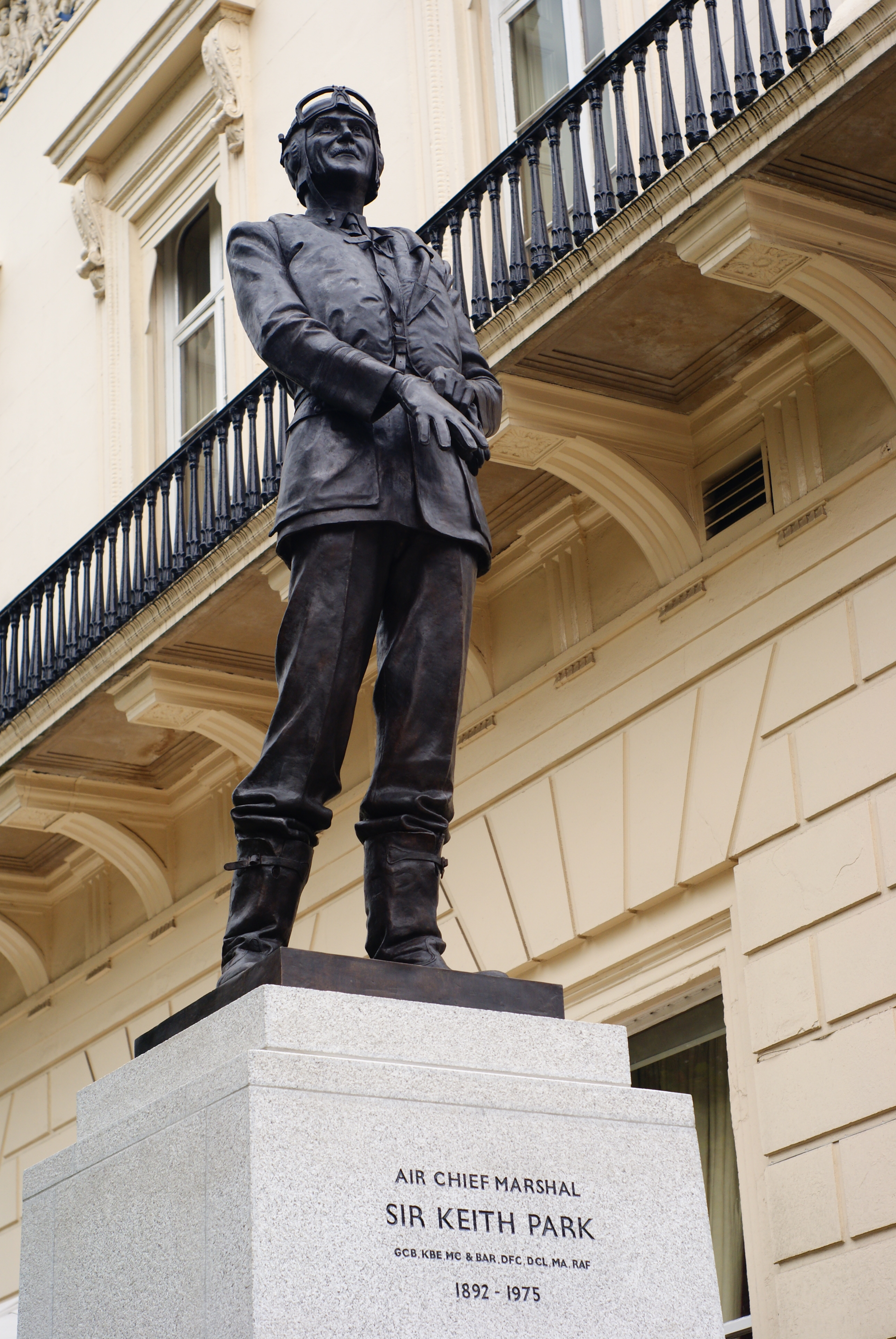
Statue of Sir Keith Park in Waterloo Place, London

In New Zealand, Park is commemorated by the Sir Keith Park Memorial Airfield in Thames and at the aviation section of the Museum of Transport and Technology in Auckland, the gate guardian of which is a replica of the Hurricane which Park flew while commanding No. 11 Group. The machine is not an accurate representation, as it has a stripe around the rear of the fuselage in duck-egg green, which was not introduced until the spring of 1941, by which time he was commanding Training Command. The Sir Keith Park Special School in Māngere, South Auckland, bears his name. In 2019, a bronze statue of Park was unveiled outside the Thames War Memorial Civic Centre. The statue was funded by a $200,000 bequest from Betty Hare, who felt that Park deserved greater recognition in his homeland. On 14 September 2025, a bronze status of Park, positioned underneath a replica of his Hurricane fighter, was unveiled at Thames airfield.

Park's uniform and medals, among them the 1939–1945 Star, are on display at the Auckland War Memorial Museum. Despite the physical presence of a Battle of Britain clasp on his 1939-45 Star, until recently Park's name was not on the official list of aircrew who were entitled to the clasp. After an investigation by historian Dilip Sarkar, Park's name was added to the list on the basis of having made at least one operational sortie during the battle.

In the United Kingdom, Keith Park Crescent, a residential road near the former RAF station at Biggin Hill, is named after him, as is Keith Park Road in Uxbridge.

A Southern Railway (Great Britain) West Country Class/Battle of Britain Class locomotive, No. 34053 was named after him in 1947, Park being present at its dedication ceremony. The locomotive has survived into preservation, and has been restored from scrapyard condition. Rededicated to Park in 2013, the locomotive is presently owned by Southern Locomotives Ltd and based on the Spa Valley Railway.

Thanks to the advocacy of financier Terry Smith, on 4 November 2009 a temporary 5-metre (16 ft) tall fibreglass statue of Park was unveiled on the Fourth plinth in Trafalgar Square. This was in recognition of his role in the Battle of Britain. Members of Park's family were present for the unveiling, which occurred in front of 1,000 people. It remained on display for six months before being moved to the Royal Air Force Museum in London in May 2010.

A more permanent recognition for Park in London was still desired and in May 2009 the Westminster City Council agreed to erect a 2.78-metre (9.1 ft) tall statue in Waterloo Place. A bronze version of the sculpture displayed on the Fourth plinth was installed at Waterloo Place and unveiled there on 15 September 2010, during the 70th anniversary commemorations of the Battle. Chief of the Air Staff, Air Chief Marshal Sir Stephen Dalton, said that Park was "a man without whom the history of the Battle of Britain could have been disastrously different. He was a man who never failed at any task he was given."

== Notes ==
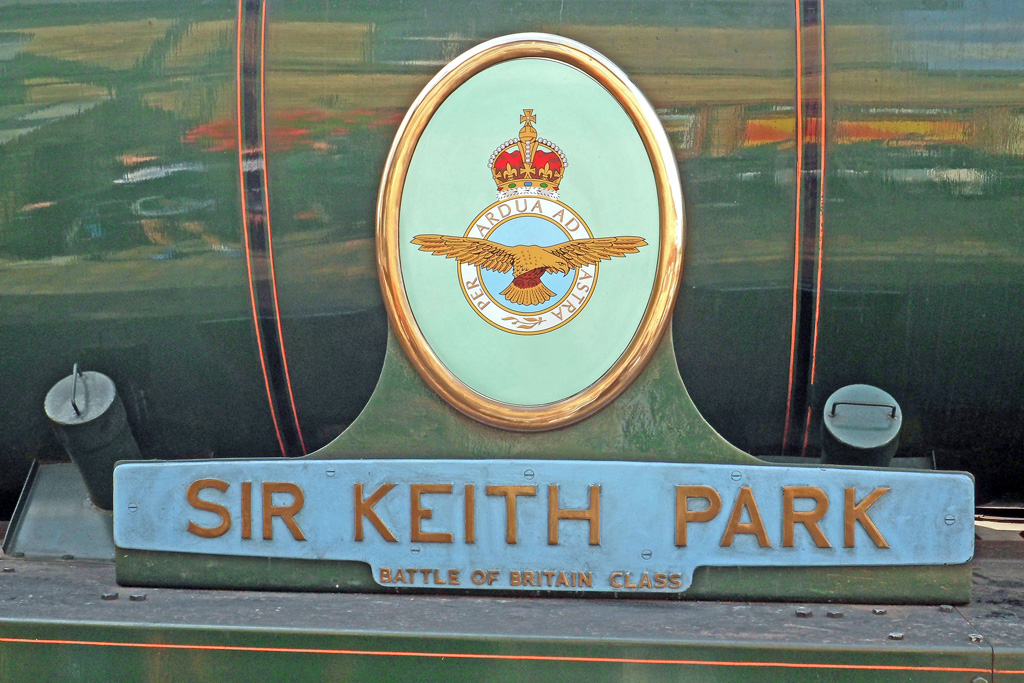
Sir Keith Park commemorative nameplate and RAF shield on a Southern Railway "Battle of Britain" Class locomotive

=== Citations ===
Military offices
Preceded by William Welsh	Air Officer Commanding No. 11 Group; April–December 1940	Succeeded by Trafford Leigh-Mallory
Preceded by Sir Sholto Douglas	Commander-in-Chief Middle East Command; 1944–1945	Succeeded by Sir Charles Medhurst
Preceded by Sir Guy Garrod	Allied C-in-C Air Command, South East Asia; 1945–1946	Succeeded by Sir George Pirie
