= List of public art in Hyde Park, London =

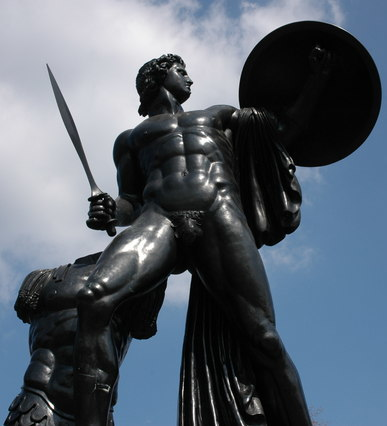
Detail of the Wellington Monument

This is a list of public art in Hyde Park, London.

A Royal Park since 1536, Hyde Park covers an area of over 350 acres. Its present landscaping dates largely to the 18th century, when Queen Caroline introduced the Serpentine among other features, and to the 1820s, when Decimus Burton made improvements including the park's triumphal entrance at Wellington Arch. In the immediate vicinity of the arch, at Hyde Park Corner, there is a significant concentration of war memorials.

== Hyde Park ==
Image	Title / subject	Location and coordinates	Date	Artist / designer	Architect / other	Type	Designation	Notes
	Dell Megalith	The Dell 51°30′16″N 0°09′33″W	1861	John Thomas	—N/a	Former drinking fountain	—N/a	The remains of a drinking fountain originally formed of several large blocks of granite, possibly quarried at Moorswater, Cornwall. This became defunct in 1887 and only a single stone was still standing by 1900.
More images	Boy and Dolphin	Rose Garden, South Carriage Drive 51°30′13″N 0°09′17″W	1863	Alexander Munro	—N/a	Fountain with sculpture	Grade II	Moved in 1962 from Hyde Park to the Broad Walk, Regent’s Park. Returned to Hyde Park in 1994, in a different location from its original setting.
More images	Conduit House Memorial	Serpentine Road 51°30′18″N 0°09′34″W	1871	?	—N/a	Urn on plinth	Grade II	Marks the site of a conduit house which supplied the precinct of Westminster with water until the spring was cut off by drainage works in 1861. The building was demolished in 1868.
More images	Statue of George Gordon Byron, 6th Baron Byron	The top of West Carriage Drive, between Buckhill Playground and Victoria Gate 51°30′40″N 0°10′23″W	1880	Richard Claude Belt	—N/a	Statue	Grade II	Unveiled 24 May 1880. Inspired by a line from Childe Harold's Pilgrimage (1812–1818): "To sit on rocks and muse o'er flood and fell". Byron is shown with his Newfoundland dog, Bo'sun. The marble pedestal, supplied by the Greek government, was added in 1882. The statue was moved here from its original site in the south-eastern corner of Hyde Park, which had become an inaccessible traffic island, in 2026.
More images	Diana	Rose Garden, South Carriage Drive 51°30′13″N 0°09′19″W	1899	Lady Feodora Gleichen	—N/a	Fountain with sculpture	Grade II	Made for the garden of Sir Walter Palmer's house Frognal, in Ascot, Berkshire; presented to Hyde Park by Lady Jean Palmer in 1906. Also referred to as the Huntress Fountain.
More images	Memorial to the Cavalry of the Empire	Serpentine Road 51°30′17″N 0°09′19″W	1924	Adrian Jones	John James Burnet	Equestrian sculpture with stone screen	Grade II*	Unveiled 21 May 1924 at Stanhope Gate; moved in 1961 for the widening of Park Lane. The armour was based on that of the fifteenth-century effigy of the Earl of Warwick at St Mary's, Warwick, the horse’s furniture on that found in Dürer’s engraving of Saint George.
More images	Memorial to William Henry Hudson	West Carriage Drive 51°30′30″N 0°10′08″W	1925	Jacob Epstein	Eric Gill (lettering)	Stone screen with relief sculpture	Grade II	Unveiled 19 May 1925 by Stanley Baldwin. Located near the Bird Sanctuary erected in Hudson's memory, the memorial depicts the bird-spirit Rima, a character from his novel Green Mansions (1904). A controversial early work by Epstein, the sculpture was dubbed "the Hyde Park Atrocity" by its detractors.
	Memorial to George Lansbury	Hyde Park Lido Pavilion 51°30′17″N 0°10′10″W	1953	Harold Wilson Parker	—N/a	Plaque	—N/a	Unveiled 1953 by Clement Attlee. Lansbury established the Hyde Park Lido in 1930, when he was First Commissioner of Works. The plaque in his honour was installed as part of the post-War reconstruction of the Lido Pavilion.
More images	Four Winds Fountain	Aldford Street North Gate, near Park Lane 51°30′29″N 0°09′25″W	1963	T. B. Huxley-Jones	—N/a	Fountain with sculptural group	—N/a	Unveiled 25 June 1963; the site was formerly occupied by Munro’s Boy and Dolphin (see above). Originally titled Joy of Life, this was the last commission of the Constance Fund. The fountain basins were redesigned and the work's name changed in 2000–2001.
	Little Nell	Patte d'Oie north of east end of Serpentine, Serpentine Road 51°30′19″N 0°09′19″W	1975 (after an original of 1896)	After William Robert Colton	—N/a	Fountain with sculpture	Grade II	A replica in artificial stone of a lost Art Nouveau original, described as representing a "winged child with fish". The name "Little Nell" has apparently only been attached to the work more recently; it has also been referred to variously as the "Colton Memorial" and the "Mermaid Fountain".
More images	Norwegian War Memorial	West of Ranger's Lodge 51°30′23″N 0°10′05″W	1978	?	—N/a	Commemorative stone mounted on three smaller stones	—N/a	A large Precambrian boulder mounted on three smaller stones. Presented by the Norwegian Navy and Merchant Fleet in thanks for Britain’s support in World War II.
	Year of the Child Drinking Fountain	Eastern side of the park, in front of The Reservoir public toilets 51°30′29″N 0°09′40″W	1981	Polly Hope	Theo Crosby	Drinking fountain with sculpture	—N/a	Unveiled 4 December 1981. A memorial to the Great Children's Party held in the park in 1979.
More images	Holocaust Memorial	East of the Dell 51°30′15″N 0°09′32″W	1983	Mark Badger	Richard Seifert; Derek Lovejoy and Partners	Commemorative stones	—N/a	Unveiled 28 June 1983; the first public memorial in Britain to victims of the Holocaust. The largest boulder bears an inscription from Lamentations (3:48) in Hebrew and English: for these i weep/ streams of tears flow/ from my eyes/ because of the destruction/ of my people.
	Household Cavalry Memorial	South Carriage Drive 51°30′11″N 0°09′21″W	1985	?	—N/a	Raised slate floor plaque in hedge enclosure	—N/a	Commemorates the four soldiers of the Blues and Royals regiment who were killed in the IRA bombing of 20 July 1982 near this spot. The horses killed by the bomb are commemorated by a water trough, which was moved from the Victoria Embankment to Hyde Park in 1985 to serve as a memorial.
More images	Queen Caroline Memorial Caroline of Ansbach	West of the Dell, overlooking the Serpentine 51°30′15″N 0°09′37″W	1990	?	—N/a	Urn on plinth	—N/a	Unveiled in 1990 by Elizabeth II. Inscribed To the memory of/ QUEEN CAROLINE/ wife of George II/ for whom/ the Long Water/ and Serpentine/ were created/ between/ 1727–1731.
More images	Queen Elizabeth Gate Queen Elizabeth The Queen Mother	Hyde Park 51°30′15″N 0°09′08″W	1993	David Wynne	Giuseppe Lund	Gates	—N/a	Unveiled 6 July 1993 by Elizabeth II. Lund intended for the gates to be "feminine and fresh with the charm of an English garden", in contrast to their formal and "masculine" setting. There was much public criticism of the design.
More images	Reformers' Tree The Reform League	Hyde Park 51°30′33″N 0°09′41″W	2001	Harry Gray	Roz Flint	Mosaic	—N/a	Unveiled in July 2000 by Tony Benn. Depicts a tree near this site which burnt down during the Reform League Riots in 1866, the stump of which became a notice board for political demonstrations.
More images	Diana, Princess of Wales Memorial Fountain Diana, Princess of Wales	Near West Carriage Drive and Rotten Row 51°30′17″N 0°10′17″W	2004	Kathryn Gustafson	—N/a	Fountain	—N/a	Unveiled 6 July 2004 by Elizabeth II. A low, granite oval, 210 metres in circumference, with water coursing along it. The fountain was plagued by blockages and injuries and had to be closed off twice for repairs in its first two years.
More images	Animals in War Memorial	Park Lane 51°30′40″N 0°09′26″W	2004	David Backhouse	—N/a	Stone screens with sculptures	—N/a	Unveiled 24 November 2004 by Princess Anne. Two heavily laden mules are shown trudging towards an opening between two swelling Portland stone screens; beyond lies a grass mound with a cavorting horse and dog.
More images	7 July Memorial 7 July 2005 London bombings	Near Park Lane 51°30′21″N 0°09′10″W	2009	—N/a	Carmody Groarke Architects et al.	Stelae	—N/a	Unveiled 7 July 2009 by the Prince of Wales and Duchess of Cornwall, on the fourth anniversary of the terrorist bombings. The 52 victims are each commemorated by a stainless steel stela.
More images	Serenity	Near West Carriage Drive, overlooking the Serpentine 51°30′19″N 0°10′18″W	2009	Simon Gudgeon	—N/a	Sculpture	—N/a	Unveiled 7 September 2009, and originally titled Isis. 1,000 plaques around the base were sold to donors for personalised inscriptions at £1,000 each, as a way of funding the park's Isis Education Centre for introducing young people to the study of nature. Donated to the park by the Halcyon Gallery. The work was renamed in 2015.

== Hyde Park Corner ==
The high concentration of military memorials at Hyde Park Corner, centred on Wellington Arch, has been called "one of the world's most important groups of war memorials". The arch was originally crowned with a colossal equestrian statue of the Duke of Wellington, which in 1883 was removed to Aldershot in Hampshire. The RAF Bomber Command Memorial, inaugurated in 2012, is located a short distance away in Green Park.

Image	Title / subject	Location and coordinates	Date	Artist / designer	Architect / other	Type	Designation	Notes
More images	Wellington Monument Arthur Wellesley, 1st Duke of Wellington	Off Park Lane 51°30′16″N 0°09′10″W	1822	Richard Westmacott	—N/a	Statue	Grade I	Unveiled 18 June 1822. Wellington is represented symbolically by the hero Achilles, although the head is said to be modelled on the Duke's. The statue, partly inspired by the classical sculptures of the Dioscuri on the Quirinal Hill in Rome, was cast from captured French cannon. The first public nude statue in London since antiquity.
	Frieze	Hyde Park Corner Screen (Apsley Gate)	1828	John Henning Jr with John Henning Sr and Samuel Henning	Decimus Burton	Frieze	Grade I	Inspired by the frieze of the Parthenon. An equestrian statue of George III intended to surmount the screen was never executed.
More images	Statue of Arthur Wellesley, 1st Duke of Wellington	Hyde Park Corner 51°30′10″N 0°09′05″W	1888	Joseph Edgar Boehm	Howard Ince	Equestrian statue	Grade II	Unveiled 21 December 1888. The pedestal is flanked by four soldiers representing the four nations of the United Kingdom. Alfred Gilbert, an assistant in Boehm's studio, claimed to have modelled the horse.
More images	Peace	Wellington Arch, Hyde Park Corner 51°30′09″N 0°09′03″W	1908–1912	Adrian Jones	Decimus Burton	Quadriga	Grade I	Unveiled 2 April 1912. Burton originally intended for a quadriga to surmount his arch, but in 1845 an equestrian statue of Wellington was installed in its place. This was removed to Aldershot when the arch's orientation was changed in 1883. Edward VII commissioned the present group, but did not live to see its completion.
More images	Machine Gun Corps Memorial (David)	Hyde Park Corner 51°30′12″N 0°09′03″W	1925	Francis Derwent Wood	—N/a	Memorial with sculpture	Grade II*	Unveiled 10 May 1925 by the Duke of Connaught. Re-erected on current location in 1962. The second bronze model for the figure stood in Chelsea Embankment Gardens from 1963 until it was stolen in the 1970s; it has been replaced by a replica.
More images	Royal Artillery Memorial	Hyde Park Corner 51°30′09″N 0°09′07″W	1925	Charles Sargeant Jagger	Lionel Pearson	Memorial with sculpture	Grade I	Unveiled 18 October 1925 by the Duke of Connaught. The regiment demanded a "realistic" memorial and got one, crowned with a howitzer rendered in stone. The figure of a dead soldier shrouded in a greatcoat was still, however, found to be unsettling.
More images	Tile murals	Hyde Park Corner pedestrian subway	1995	FreeForm Arts Trust	—N/a	Tile murals	—N/a	900 m^{2} (9,700 sq ft) of murals depicting the history of the area, painted by a team of six artists led by Alan Rossiter.
More images	Australian War Memorial	Hyde Park Corner 51°30′08″N 0°09′05″W	2003	Janet Laurence	Tonkin Zulaikha Greer Architects	Stone screen	—N/a	A curving granite wall inscribed with the names of 24,000 Australian towns and villages and of battles in both World Wars. Water runs down parts of the wall and slabs up against it bear the country’s coat of arms and military badges.
More images	New Zealand War Memorial	Hyde Park Corner 51°30′11″N 0°09′01″W	2006	Paul Dibble	John Hardwick-Smith	Stelae	—N/a	Unveiled 11 November 2006 by Elizabeth II. Consists of 16 bronze X beams (or "standards"), six of which are arranged in the shape of the Southern Cross constellation.

== Marble Arch ==
Image	Title / subject	Location and coordinates	Date	Artist / designer	Architect / other	Type	Designation	Notes
More images	Marble Arch	Marble Arch 51°30′47″N 0°09′32″W	1825–1833	John Flaxman, Richard Westmacott and Edward Hodges Baily	John Nash (altered by Edward Blore; relocated by Thomas Cubitt)	Triumphal arch	Grade I	The first entirely marble-clad building in Britain, designed as a ceremonial gateway to the forecourt of Buckingham Palace and modelled on the Arch of Constantine in Rome.
	Mosaics	Marble Arch pedestrian subway 51°30′46″N 0°09′35″W	1962	William Mitchell	—N/a	Mosaics	—N/a	Mitchell was chosen for this commission by the architect Frederick Gibberd, with whom he had collaborated previously. The murals use a combination of traditional and experimental mosaic techniques. Another set of mosaics which was part of the same redevelopment scheme, at Hyde Park Corner, has been removed.
More images	Freeman Family Drinking Fountain	North Carriage Drive, near Marble Arch 51°30′43″N 0°09′45″W	2009	David Harber	—N/a	Drinking fountain	—N/a	Unveiled 23 September 2009. A stainless steel sphere decorated with petals of oxidised bronze. Donated to the park by Michael Freeman, a property developer and trustee of the Royal Parks Foundation, and his wife.
More images	Still Water	Marble Arch 51°30′46″N 0°09′35″W	2010	Nic Fiddian-Green	—N/a	Sculpture	—N/a	Unveiled 14 September 2010. At the time it was the largest freestanding bronze sculpture in London, at 33 ft (10 m) high. It replaces a previous version temporarily installed on this site; commissioned by Sir Anthony Bamford and his wife, it is now on their estate in Daylesford, Gloucestershire. The replacement work, which is larger, is on long-term loan from the sculptor.
	From this moment despair ends and tactics begin	Marble Arch 51°30′47″N 0°09′33″W	2019	Attributed to Banksy	—N/a	Mural	—N/a	The work appeared over the night of 25–26 April 2019, while the protest movement Extinction Rebellion was camped on the site. The slogan is a quotation from The Revolution of Everyday Life (1967) by Raoul Vaneigem.
More images	Circadian	Marble Arch Place 51°30′49″N 0°09′36″W	2021	Lee Simmons	—N/a	Sculpture	—N/a	Unveiled 29 September 2021. 11 metres (36 ft) high, the metal sculpture is intended to represent a floral form. Its title refers to circadian rhythm.

== See also ==
- Christo and Jeanne-Claude § The London Mastaba, a temporary floating installation in the Serpentine in 2018
- List of public art in Kensington Gardens
- List of public art in Knightsbridge

== Bibliography ==
- Bradley, Simon; Pevsner, Nikolaus (2003). London: Westminster. The Buildings of England. Vol. 6. London and New Haven: Yale University Press.
- Cavanagh, Terry (2023). Public Sculpture of Kensington and Chelsea with Westminster South-West. Public Sculpture of Britain. Vol. 22. Watford: Public Statues and Sculpture Association. ISBN 978-1-8383976-2-3.
- Kershman, Andrew (2013). London's Monuments. London: Metro Publications.
- Land Use Consultants (2014). Hyde Park Management Plan (PDF). The Royal Parks. Archived from the original (PDF) on 23 January 2015.
- Matthews, Peter (2018). London's Statues and Monuments. Oxford: Shire Publications.
- Ward-Jackson, Philip (2011). Public Sculpture of Historic Westminster: Volume 1. Public Sculpture of Britain. Liverpool: Liverpool University Press.
- Williamson, Philip; Baldwin, Edward, eds. (2004). Baldwin Papers: A Conservative Statesman 1908–1947. Cambridge: Cambridge University Press. ISBN 9780521580809.
