= New Zealand War Memorial, London =

Memorial to New Zealanders killed in both World Wars in London, England

Coordinates: 51.5031°N 0.1504°W

New Zealand War Memorial
- United Kingdom
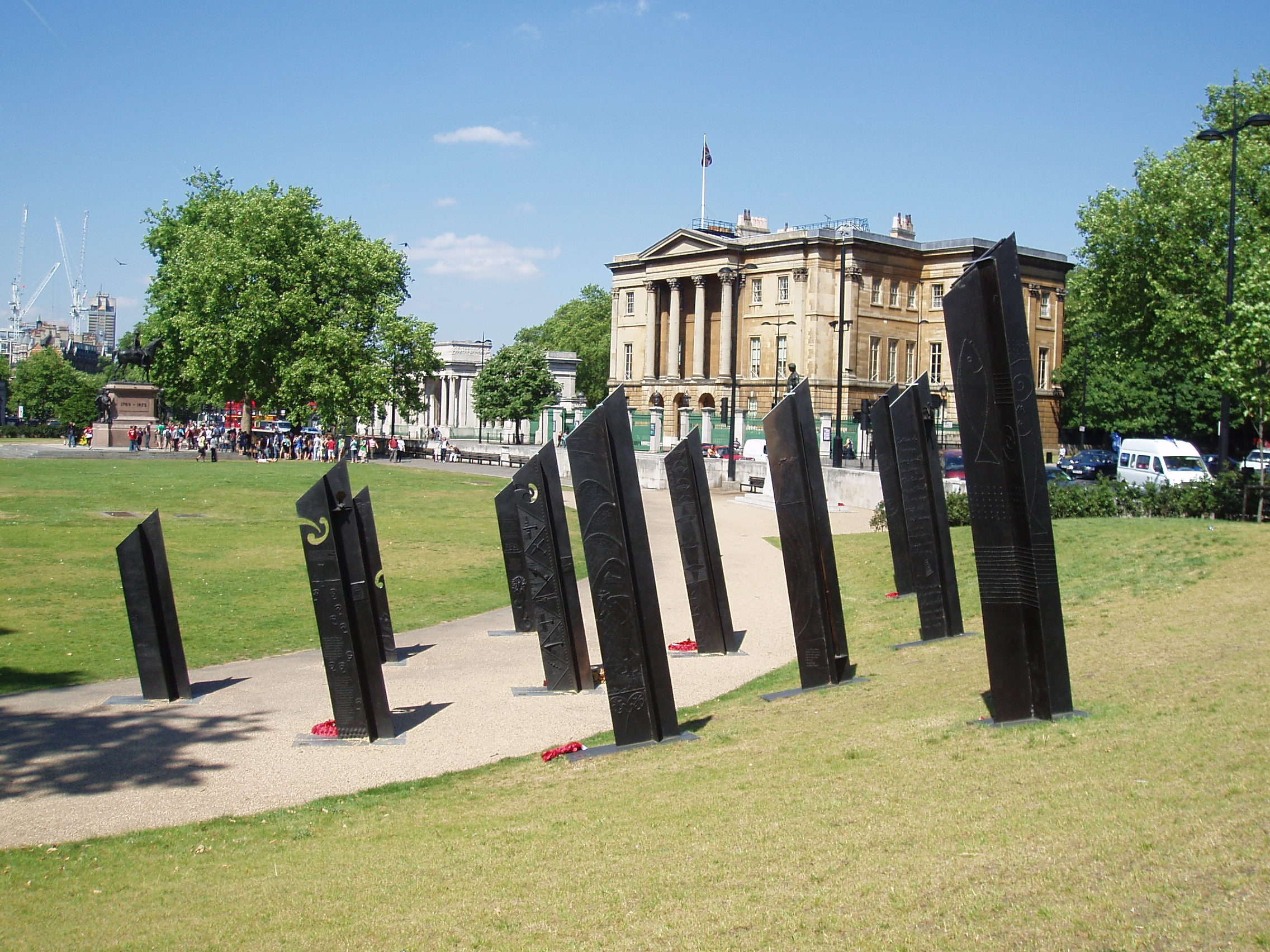
- For New Zealand's military personnel who died during the First and Second World Wars
- Unveiled: 11 November 2006; 18 years ago
- Location: Hyde Park Corner, London
- Designed by: John Hardwick-Smith (architect); Paul Dibble (sculptor)

The New Zealand War Memorial in London is a memorial to the war dead of New Zealand in the First and Second World Wars, unveiled in 2006. Officially named "Southern Stand", the memorial was designed by architect John Hardwick-Smith and sculptor Paul Dibble, both from New Zealand.

It is located on the Piccadilly side of Hyde Park Corner, northeast of the Wellington Arch, and is diagonally opposite the Australian War Memorial. The traffic island also houses an Equestrian statue of the Duke of Wellington, the Machine Gun Corps Memorial and the Royal Artillery Memorial.

== Background ==
The memorial was established to commemorate "the enduring bond between New Zealand and the United Kingdom", and the lives lost by the two countries during the two World Wars. Dibble said:

We set the memorial in a position where the main pedestrian route runs through the memorial so that visitors will walk amongst the sculptures, encouraging people to stop and explore. Through the words and images, any New Zealander visiting the memorial will recognise home, and British people may learn something of the relationship between our two countries.

Thousands of soldiers from New Zealand served with the British Army in South Africa during the Boer War, at Gallipoli and on the Western Front during the First World War, and the Second New Zealand Expeditionary Force served in England, the Middle East and Italy in the Second World War. Hundreds of New Zealanders also served in the Royal Flying Corps, Royal Air Force, and Royal Navy, including the battlecruiser HMS New Zealand and the light cruiser HMS Achilles. Prominent wartime commanders with connections to New Zealand included Bernard Freyberg and Keith Park.

== Design ==
The memorial comprises 16 bronze "standards" set out on a grassy slope at the east end of the Hyde Park Corner traffic island. Each standard is a cross-shaped metal girder weighing about 700 kilograms (1,500 lb), cast by the Heavy Metal Company in Lower Hutt, and set in a concrete foundation, with surrounds of British slate. The dark patinated surfaces of the standards are adorned with different texts, patterns and small sculptures, all symbolic of New Zealand, including fern shapes, a manaia figure, plants and animals from New Zealand, emblems of the New Zealand armed forces, and references to authors and artists from New Zealand.

The girders project from the ground at an angle towards the south. The angle is intended to resemble the posture of warriors performing a haka, or a cricket bat playing a defensive stroke, or the barrel of a shouldered gun. The standards have different heights, with the ends cut off at a diagonal so they resemble cross-like grave markers from a distance.

Nine of the standards form in a regular grid pattern, with a tenth as a leader. The six other standards stand away from the main group in a pattern similar to the Southern Cross, and bear LED lights that can be illuminated. The formal arrangement is intended to resemble a group of soldiers in procession, or Māori pouwhenua markers, or Celtic standing stones.

Richard Shone, editor of The Burlington Magazine, criticised the memorial and its design in an attack on the "infestation of public space", describing it as "bristlingly unlovely".

== History ==
The proposal for a memorial in London was initially made by the government of New Zealand in 2003. In October 2004, 12 design teams were selected from the 68 who submitted expressions of interest in the New Zealand War Memorial. These teams submitted designs for the prospective monument and an expert panel, appointed by the Ministry for Culture and Heritage, selected the final design. The design was then refined and submitted to Westminster City Council in London for planning approval. The design was a collaboration between New Zealand firms Dibble Art Co and Athfield Architects, led by Dibble and Hardwick-Smith respectively, with Jon Rennie as the team's London representative. The budget for the design and construction of the memorial was NZ$3 million.

The official dedication of the New Zealand War Memorial took place on 11 November 2006 (Armistice Day) by Queen Elizabeth II, in her capacity as Queen of New Zealand. In attendance were the Prime Minister of New Zealand Helen Clark and British Prime Minister Tony Blair, as well as Prince Philip, Duke of Edinburgh and other members of the Royal Family, and Lieutenant General Jerry Mateparae, Chief of the New Zealand Defence Force, and Air Chief Marshal Jock Stirrup, Chief of the UK Defence Staff. The ceremony included Hayley Westenra performing "God Save the Queen" and "God Defend New Zealand" (the two national anthems of New Zealand), Ngāti Rānana singing a Māori song, "Pō Atarau", and the performance of a haka, and also a flypast by an RNZAF Boeing 757 and RAF Typhoons.

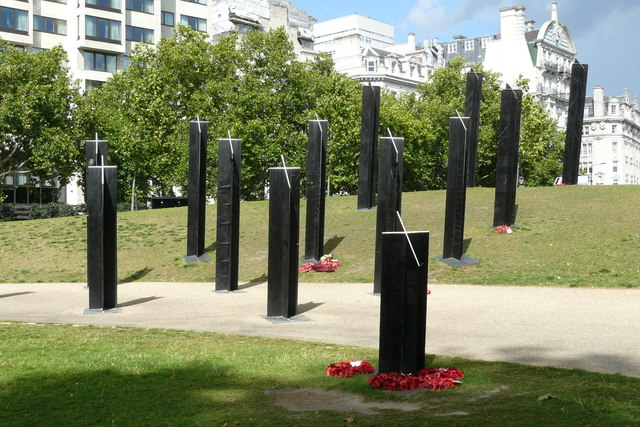

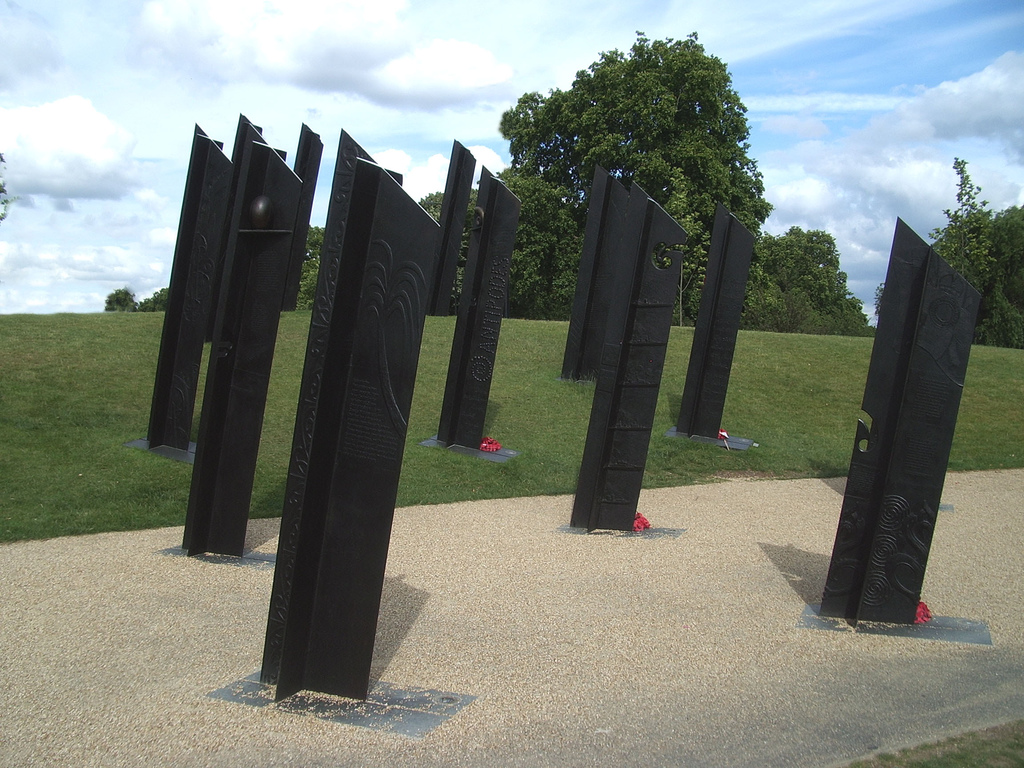

== See also ==
- List of public art in Hyde Park, London
- World War I memorials
- the New Zealand Memorial in Greenwich commemorates the dead of the New Zealand War of 1863–64
