= Gunner (rank) =

Military rank

Gunner (Gnr) is a rank equivalent to private in the British Army Royal Artillery and the artillery corps of other Commonwealth armies. The next highest rank is usually lance-bombardier, although in the Royal Canadian Artillery it is bombardier. Historically, there was an inferior rank, matross.

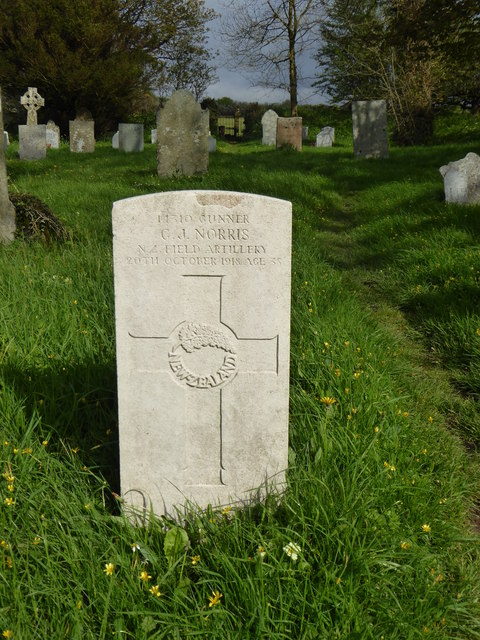
Grave of Gunner C. J. Norris of the New Zealand Field Artillery, died 1915

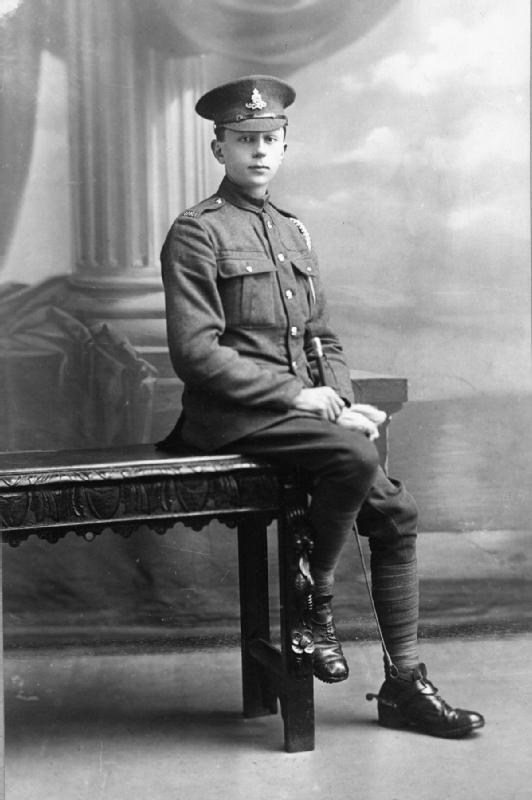
Gunner John Phelps Williams, Royal Field Artillery (1916/17)

== Monuments ==
There is a bronze statue of a gunner called "The Ammunition Carrier" as part of the Royal Artillery Memorial in Hyde Park Corner, commemorating the Royal Artillery Regiment's service and memorializing its losses in World War I. The other bronze figures are "The Captain" (at the front), "The Driver" (at the left side), and "The Fallen Soldier" (at the rear) and it is topped with an elevated stone howitzer. The statues were done by Charles Sargeant Jagger and the stone monument was designed by Lionel Pearson. The gunner statue, along with the officer, the bombardier and the unknown soldier, are characters in Charlie Fletcher's Stoneheart.

== See also ==
- British Army Other Ranks rank insignia
- Comparative military ranks
- Canadian Forces ranks and insignia
