= Frankfurt School of Finance & Management =

Business school in Germany

- Motto: A World of Possibilities
- Type: Private, non-profit
- Established: 1957; 69 years ago
- Accreditation: AACSB, AMBA, EQUIS (Triple accreditation)
- President: Nils Stieglitz
- Location: Frankfurt am Main, Hesse, Germany
- Campus: Urban
- Website: www.frankfurt-school.de/en

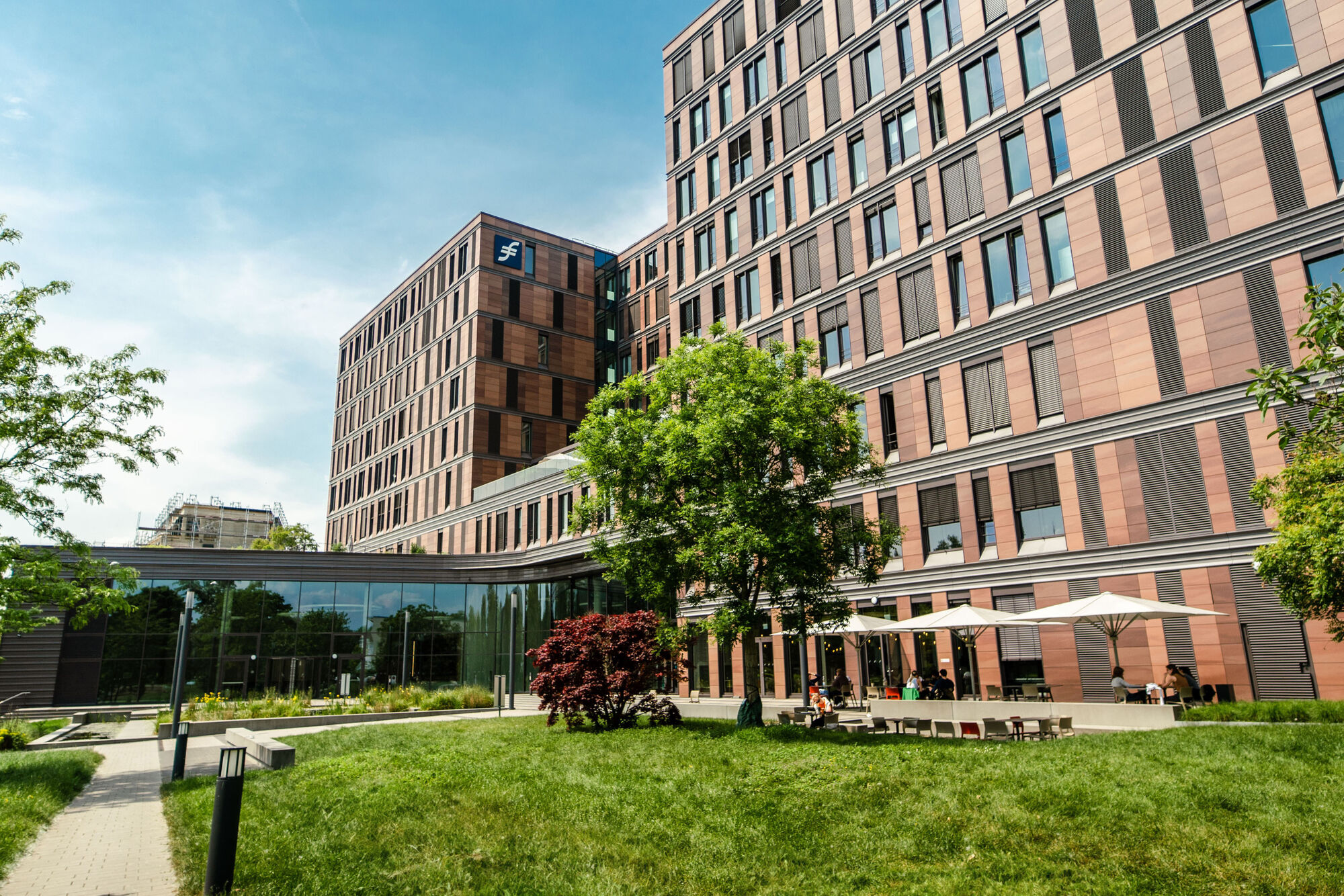
Campus of Frankfurt School of Finance & Management

Frankfurt School of Finance & Management (Frankfurt School) is a private business school in Frankfurt am Main, Germany, officially recognised under the Higher Education Act of the State of Hesse and authorised to award doctorates. It is organised as a non-profit institution under Frankfurt School of Finance & Management Foundation.

The institution offers undergraduate, postgraduate, doctoral and executive education programmes in business, finance and management. It maintains partnerships with companies, foundations, start-ups, central banks and non-governmental organisations.

== History ==
Frankfurt School traces its origins to 1957, when Professor Dr Karl Friedrich Hagenmüller and Dr Dr h. c. Reinhold Sellien founded the Bankakademie e.V. (Banking Academy) on the premises of the Gabler publishing house in Wiesbaden. Its initial mission was to provide professional training for bank employees.

In 1966, the Bankakademie e.V. was restructured and evolved into the Frankfurter Bankakademie e.V., with regional private banking associations and the National Association of German Cooperative Banks as members. Its programme portfolio was also developed and expanded.

By 1972, the Bankfachwirt programme had become the primary component of Bankakademie e.V.’s professional education portfolio. In the same period, the portfolio expanded to include Management and Bank Betriebswirt certification courses. Later, seminars and training programmes were introduced.

In 1990, the institution established the Hochschule für Bankwirtschaft (HfB), a higher education institution focused on banking and finance education. In 1992, the International Advisory Services (IAS) unit was created to support advisory and training projects in developing and emerging economies.

In 1995, the first cohort of 35 students completed their business administration degrees at HfB. The programmes combined academic study with vocational training or part-time employment, and included mandatory international work placements. In 2004, HfB was granted the right to award doctorates.

On 17 January 2007, Frankfurter Bankakademie e.V. and Hochschule für Bankwirtschaft formally merged to form Frankfurt School of Finance & Management. Since January 2008, the institution has operated as a non-profit company with limited liability (gGmbH), supported by the Frankfurt School of Finance & Management Foundation.

In the winter semester of 2017/18, Frankfurt School moved to its current campus on Adickesallee in the Nordend district of Frankfurt am Main. The campus was constructed between 2014 and 2017.

== Campus ==
=== Frankfurt ===
Frankfurt School's main campus is located on Adickesallee in the Nordend district of Frankfurt am Main. The campus opened in 2017 and was built on the site of the former regional tax office. The campus was designed by the Danish architectural firm Henning Larsen Architects following an international competition. The complex includes lecture halls, seminar rooms, library facilities and finance laboratories.

In 2019, the building received DGNB Platinum certification from the German Sustainable Building Council (DGNB) under the “Buildings New Construction – Mixed Use” category. According to the DGNB assessment, the campus achieved evaluation scores in environmental, economic and sociocultural quality categories. The complex also includes collaborative study areas, digital teaching infrastructure and event spaces used for academic and executive education activities.

=== e-Campus ===
Frankfurt School operates the e-Campus, an online learning platform launched in 2010 that provides digital education programmes in areas including sustainable finance, financial inclusion, green finance and development finance. The platform offers online certificate courses, blended-learning diploma programmes and a fully online Master of Leadership in Sustainable Finance, serving an international community of learners and professionals.

=== Other locations ===
Frankfurt School also operates a campus in Hamburg, which opened in 2011 in the HafenCity district. Additional study location is maintained in Munich. In 2025, Frankfurt School opened an executive education centre in Dubai.

== Organisation ==
Frankfurt School of Finance & Management is governed by an executive board responsible for the institution’s strategic and operational management. The President serves as the head of the institution and oversees overall leadership.

The academic structure is organised into several departments, including Finance, Management, Economics and Law, Accounting, and Computational Science and Philosophy. Governance is supported by additional internal bodies, including a supervisory board and an academic senate, which contribute to oversight and academic decision-making within the institution.

== Activities ==
=== Academic programmes ===
Frankfurt School offers Bachelor, Master and MBA programmes, as well as continuing professional development programmes and a doctoral programme. Most programmes are delivered on the Frankfurt campus, with selected programmes also offered at the Hamburg campus, the Munich study centre, and other locations in Germany. Many programmes allow students to specialise through optional concentrations. All programmes (Bachelor, Master and MBA) include either a mandatory or optional international work placement and at least one semester of study at a partner university abroad.

=== Executive & Professional Education ===
Frankfurt School's Executive & Professional Education department provides certification courses, seminars, workshops and executive training programmes in business, finance and related fields. The programmes focus on continuing and executive education in areas related to finance, management, governance, regulation and digital innovation.

The programme portfolio includes subject areas such as Asset & Wealth Management, Corporate Finance, Mergers & Acquisition, real estate, Controlling & Accounting, Tax Law, Strategy & Management, Leadership & Communication, Corporate Governance & Board Services, Sustainable Finance & ESG, Development Finance, General Banking, Credit Finance, Regulation & Risk Management, Compliance, Forensics & Audit, Digital Transformation and Blockchain & Fintech Innovation.

Frankfurt School's executive education programmes have also appeared in international business school and accreditation-related rankings and assessments.

=== International Advisory Services ===
The International Advisory Services (IAS) department of Frankfurt School of Finance & Management has operated since 1992 and provides consultancy, training and educational services in the field of financial sector development. Its activities focus on areas including sustainable finance, financial inclusion, and institutional development in banking and financial systems.

IAS works with public and private sector organisations, including development banks, governments, central banks and financial institutions. Its projects are primarily carried out in developing, emerging and frontier economies, and include advisory, research and capacity-building activities related to banking, small and medium-sized enterprises, agricultural finance and sustainable investment.

=== FS-UNEP Collaborating Centre ===
The Frankfurt School-UNEP Collaborating Centre on Sustainable Finance is a partnership between Frankfurt School of Finance & Management and the United Nations Environment Programme (UNEP), based within the IAS department.

The centre supports projects related to sustainable finance, climate finance and resource management, working with public and private sector institutions, including supervisory authorities, banks and financial organisations. Its activities focus on areas such as climate change mitigation and adaptation, biodiversity conservation, resource efficiency and sustainable investment.

=== Sustainable World Academy (SWA) ===
The Sustainable World Academy (SWA) offers continuing education programmes designed to equip professionals worldwide with knowledge and tools related to sustainable development. The programmes combine practice-oriented learning, online study formats and on-campus elements, and may be adapted to the needs of organisations and institutions.

Through internationally recognised certifications, SWA supports individuals and institutions in integrating sustainability into financial decision-making and addressing global sustainability challenges.

=== Research ===
Frankfurt School is a higher education institution active in business and management research, with a large faculty and 12 research centres focusing on specific areas of research. Around 100 faculty members publish research in international peer-reviewed journals, present at academic conferences, and participate in joint research projects with industry practitioners.

Frankfurt School is also among the research-active business schools in Germany. In the University of Texas at Dallas (UTD) Top 100 Business School Research Rankings, it is ranked within the leading group of institutions globally based on publication output.

== Faculty ==
Frankfurt School faculty is organised into five academic departments: Finance, Management, Economics & Law, Accounting, and Computational Science & Philosophy.

The faculty engages in teaching and research across business, economics and related disciplines, with activities including publication in peer-reviewed journals, academic conferences, and applied research projects with industry partners.

=== Education Management ===
Frankfurt School provides vocational training and education management services for companies in Germany, including support in recruitment, trainee development and examination preparation. Training programmes include banking, office management, real estate and dialogue marketing. Frankfurt School also offers continuing education programmes for instructors, trainers and lecturers.

== Accreditations ==
Frankfurt School of Finance & Management is a state-recognized private higher education institution in Germany. Its bachelor's, master's and doctoral degrees are legally equivalent to the corresponding degrees awarded by public universities.

The German Council of Science and Humanities (Wissenschaftsrat) first granted institutional accreditation to Frankfurt School in 2010. Following an evaluation in 2015, the institution was granted permanent doctoral awarding powers in 2016. In October 2022, Frankfurt School underwent institutional reaccreditation, including a review of its doctoral awarding powers.

Frankfurt School's degree programmes are covered by system accreditation. In 2021, the German Accreditation Council renewed the institution's system accreditation for a further eight years.

Internationally, Frankfurt School is accredited by the Association to Advance Collegiate Schools of Business (AACSB), the EFMD Quality Improvement System (EQUIS), and the Association of MBAs (AMBA).

AACSB accreditation was first awarded in 2014 and renewed in 2024. EQUIS accreditation was first awarded in 2014 and renewed in 2017 and 2022. AMBA accreditation was first awarded in 2018 and renewed in 2023.

== Rankings ==
Frankfurt School of Finance & Management appears in several Financial Times rankings, including the Global MBA, Executive MBA, Masters in Management and Executive Education rankings.

In the Digital Leaders Ranking 2025 conducted by Emerging, Frankfurt School ranked sixth in Germany in the Data Science, AI & Business Analytics category. In Corporate Knights' Better World MBA Ranking 2025, Frankfurt School ranked second among German business schools. Manager Magazin ranked Frankfurt School first in Germany in its 2026 ranking for auditing education programmes.

In 2026, Süddeutsche Zeitung included Frankfurt School among the leading German institutions for Finance, Accounting & Banking as well as for Business, Management & Entrepreneurship. In the CHE University Ranking, Frankfurt School appeared in the top group for several business-related programmes and evaluation categories.

In the 2026 Eduniversal ranking, Frankfurt School received five Palmes of Excellence and a Deans’ Recommendation Score of 329‰. In the Times Higher Education Global University Employability Ranking 2026, Frankfurt School ranked first in Germany.

== Admissions and quality assurance ==
Frankfurt School does not apply a numerus clausus (NC) system for admission. Applicants undergo a two-stage admissions process consisting of a written application followed by an assessment centre conducted in either German or English. For Bachelor programmes, the assessment process includes mathematics and cognitive tests, a personal interview, and an evaluation of English language proficiency.

All taught courses are evaluated by students. Learning objectives are defined for study programmes to specify the skills and competencies expected upon completion. These processes, together with internal quality management structures, are used to monitor and further develop teaching quality.

== Image and logo ==
Frankfurt School of Finance & Management logo

The current logo incorporates stylised elements inspired by international currency and mathematical symbols. It has been updated over time as part of the institution’s corporate design development.

== Brand identity update ==
In 2025, Frankfurt School of Finance & Management updated its brand identity, including changes to its corporate design and visual elements such as the logo and overall graphic style. A revised business school website was also launched as part of this update.

The updated brand strategy was developed based on internal and external analyses and stakeholder feedback, including input from students, alumni, staff and external partners. As part of the revised positioning, the slogan "A World of Possibilities" was introduced.

== Alumni ==
Frankfurt School has an alumni network with more than 100,000 members worldwide. It provides services including lifelong learning opportunities, career support, networking events, and specialist lectures. In addition, the Frankfurt School Alumni e.V. association has been operating for more than 25 years. It is a non-profit, independent organisation managed and funded by its members, with over 3,000 members.

The alumni network includes graduates of academic programmes (BA, BSc, MSc, MBA, Dipl.), doctoral programmes (Dr. rer. pol.), continuing professional development programmes, and certification courses offered through Executive Education and International Advisory Services.

== Notable graduates of Frankfurt School ==
- Christian Sewing, CEO of Deutsche Bank
- Daniela Schmitt, FDP, Minister of Economic Affairs of Rhineland-Palatinate in the Dreyer III Cabinet
- Sönke Rothenberger, Olympic champion in dressage
- Jörg Hessenmüller, COO Standard Chartered Bank
- Sascha Klaus, CEO of Berlin Hyp
- Michael Kotzbauer, board member of Commerzbank
- Julian Collin, Director Growth & General Manager International Markets, Trade Republic / Forbes 30 under 30
- Elena von Metzler, supervisory board Bankhaus Metzler
- Christian Zahn, Partner, McKinsey & Company
- Benjamin Michel, Co-Founder & Digital Pioneer, Finanzguru by dwins
- Paul von Preußen, Co-Founder/ GenZ-Speaker, DIGITAL8 - The Digital Native Network
- Maximilian von Kempis, CFO & COO / Managing Director (Geschäftsführer) Van Laack
- Mathias Kiep, CFO TUI Group
- Eric Reutemann, CEO EFA & Frankfurt Galaxy
- Anke Schaks, Board ERGO Deutschland
- Alice Neumann, Managing Director, Deutsche Bank New York
- Karl Werner, Managing Director & Partner BCG Zurich
- Henner Böttcher, CFO CLAAS Gruppe
- Prof. Dr. Daniel Blaseg, Assistant Professor of Entrepreneurship at Esade Business School

== See also ==
- List of universities in Germany
