= Royal Artillery Memorial =

War memorial on Hyde Park Corner, London

- United Kingdom
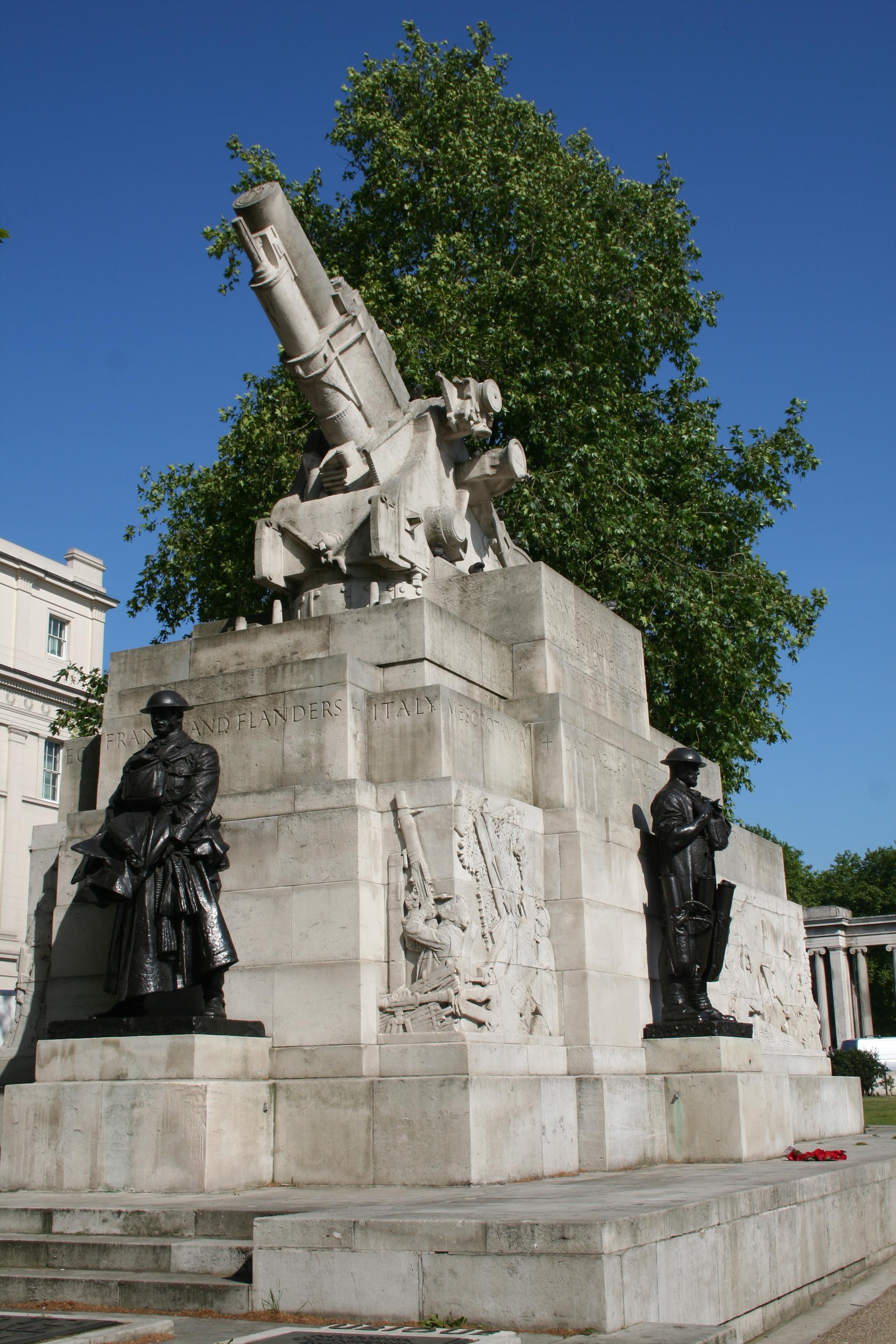
- For casualties of the Royal Regiment of Artillery in the First World War
- Unveiled: 18 October 1925
- Location: 51°30′09″N 0°09′07″W; Hyde Park Corner, London, SW1
- Designed by: Charles Sargeant Jagger, Lionel Pearson
- In proud remembrance of the forty-nine thousand & seventy-six of all ranks of the Royal Regiment of Artillery who gave their lives for king and country in the Great War 1914–1919

Listed Building – Grade I
- Official name: Royal Artillery Memorial
- Designated: 14 January 1970
- Reference no.: 1231613

The Royal Artillery Memorial is a First World War memorial located on Hyde Park Corner in London, England. Designed by Charles Sargeant Jagger, with architectural work by Lionel Pearson, and unveiled in 1925, the memorial commemorates the 49,076 soldiers from the Royal Artillery killed in the First World War. The static nature of the conflict, particularly on the Western Front, meant that artillery played a major role in the war, though physical reminders of the fighting were often avoided in the years after the war. The Royal Artillery War Commemoration Fund (RAWCF) was formed in 1918 to preside over the regiment's commemorations, aware of some dissatisfaction with memorials to previous wars. The RAWCF approached several eminent architects but its insistence on a visual representation of artillery meant that none was able to produce a satisfactory design. Thus they approached Jagger, himself an ex-soldier who had been wounded in the war. Jagger produced a design which was accepted in 1922, though he modified it several times before construction.

The memorial consists of a cruciform base in Portland stone supporting a one-third over-lifesize sculpture of a howitzer (a type of artillery field gun), which Jagger based on a gun in the Imperial War Museum. At the end of each arm of the cross is a sculpture of a soldier—an officer at the front (south side), a shell carrier on the east side, a driver on the west side, and at the rear (north) a dead soldier. The sides of the base are decorated with relief sculptures showing wartime scenes. The realism of the memorial, with the depiction of the howitzer and the dead soldier, differed significantly from other First World War memorials, notably the influential Cenotaph, which used pure architectural forms and classical symbolism. The design was controversial when unveiled; some critics viewed the dead soldier as too graphic or felt that the howitzer did not lend itself to rendition in stone. Nonetheless, the memorial was popular with others, including ex-servicemen, and later came to be recognised as Jagger's masterpiece and one of Britain's finest war memorials.

The memorial was unveiled by Prince Arthur on 18 October 1925. Dedications were later added to the memorial in memory of the 29,924 Royal Artillerymen killed in the Second World War. It underwent restoration in 2011 after years of weathering and water ingress. The memorial is a Grade I listed building and is managed by English Heritage; it now shares its site with multiple other military monuments and war memorials.

== Background ==
The First World War, which took place between 1914 and 1918, saw the extensive use of artillery, particularly on the Western Front. Technical advances, combined with the relatively static nature of trench warfare, made these guns a key element of the conflict: over half the casualties in the war were caused by artillery. Artillery guns and their crews were themselves targets, and 49,076 members of the Royal Artillery died during the conflict. In the years after the war, many former servicemen, including gunners, found the scale of the losses difficult to deal with, or felt that their trust in the political leadership that had led them into the war had been challenged. Visual reminders of the conflict were often avoided: mutilated servicemen, for example, were banned in the 1920s from joining in veterans' marches, and those with facial injuries often hid them in public. Where sculpture of human figures was used in First World War memorials, it tended to show allegorical figures such as Peace or Victory. Sculptures of soldiers were uncommon. Where they were used, the soldiers appeared healthy and smartly presented in military uniform, not dishevelled or injured.

The Royal Artillery War Commemoration Fund (RAWCF) was formed in 1918, made up of a mixture of commissioned officers and other ranks. The RAWCF's intention was to remember the artillerymen who had died during the war, and after some discussions of various options, including purchasing a house for wounded soldiers, or building a number of small shrines across the country, the RAWCF decided to construct a single memorial to the fallen Royal Artillery servicemen. Memorials to lost servicemen from the previous major conflict, the South African War fought between 1899 and 1902, had been widely criticised as being unimaginative, and members of the RAWCF were unimpressed by the Royal Artillery's memorial to that war, located on the Mall. As a result of these problems, the prominent artist Sir Edward Poynter put forward recommendations that far more care, time and funding be given to the construction of future war memorials, which were taken on board by the RAWCF.

The RAWCF first explored the option of joining some form of national commemoration which was under consideration in the aftermath of the First World War, initially wishing to spend only a small proportion of the fund on a physical monument. Plans were floated for a national memorial in the vicinity of Buckingham Palace or on the Mall. Another option mooted was a memorial cloister attached to Westminster Abbey, with contributions from the Royal Artillery and other regiments, though this was quickly discarded as unlikely to gain approval from the relevant authorities. The national proposals stalled, partly because of concerns that individual regiments would not be able to maintain their individuality—something of great importance to the RAWCF—within a uniform whole. The RAWCF began exploring sites for its own individual monument, either at Hyde Park Corner or on the edge of Buckingham Palace gardens. The RAWCF sought a design that would be "unmistakably recognisable" as an artillery monument, and were insistent that the eventual designer take detailed advice from a junior officer who had served in the war.

== Commissioning ==
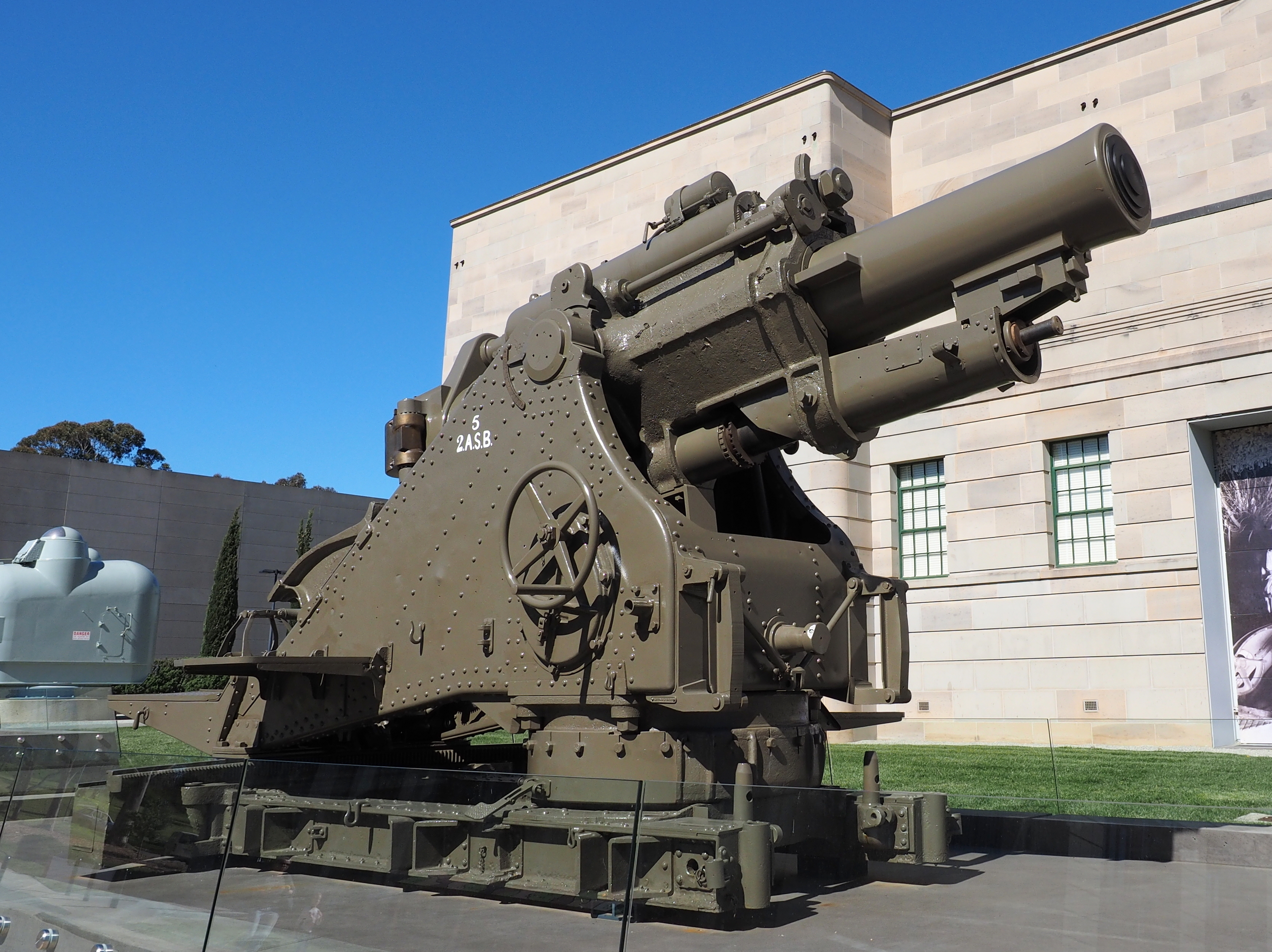
A surviving howitzer of the type represented on the Royal Artillery Memorial, this one in the collection of the Australian War Memorial in Canberra, seen in 2016

The RAWCF first examined a design by Captain Adrian Jones, who produced the Boer War Cavalry Memorial a few years before, but his design was rejected. Next, the committee contacted the architects Sir Edwin Lutyens, Herbert Baker, and Sir Aston Webb (designer of the regiment's Boer War memorial). Lutyens sent in three designs, each costed at less than £15,000 (approximately equivalent to £878,000 in 2024), but several committee members felt them to be too similar to the Cenotaph and to give insufficient prominence to artillery. Further problems arose when the Office of Works stated that it would not approve Lutyens's designs on the grounds that all would be too tall for their surroundings. After the RAWCF insisted that a howitzer be prominently incorporated into the designs, Lutyens withdrew. Baker disagreed with the concept of single-service monuments, but submitted a proposal costed at over £25,000 (approximately equivalent to £1,463,000 in 2024), which was declined and he withdrew from the project. Webb declined to submit a proposal and also withdrew.

The committee then approached the sculptor Charles Sargeant Jagger in early 1921. Jagger trained as a metal engraver before attending the Royal College of Art. He served in the infantry during the First World War and was injured at the battles of Gallipoli and Neuve-Église, being awarded the Military Cross. At the end of the war, Jagger became involved in the design of war memorials, which formed the basis of his artistic reputation. His first major memorial commission was the Hoylake and West Kirby War Memorial. The realism and starkness of the sculptures there marked Jagger out as unconventional among war memorial designers. Nonetheless, it was highly celebrated after it was exhibited at the Royal Academy in 1921, and led to other commissions across England and on foreign battlefields. Other examples include the Great Western Railway War Memorial at Paddington station in London, Portsmouth War Memorial, and the Anglo-Belgian Memorial in Brussels, though the Royal Artillery memorial is arguably his leading work.

Most of these works were in the design stage or under construction concurrently. Jagger was approached by the RAWCF both because of his reputation as a designer and because of his service as an infantry officer, although the American artist John Singer Sargent, a patron of Jagger's, may have encouraged the committee to consider the young artist. General Sir John Du Cane, a member of the RAWCF committee, encouraged his fellow members to consider Jagger on the grounds that the memorial would be the work which would establish Jagger's reputation, and thus the sculptor would produce his best work. The RAWCF requested that he submit a model for a realist sculpture, which should include a group of soldiers in bronze on a pedestal. The RAWCF felt that a realist design would have broader appeal and would be inclusive of the tastes of ordinary artillerymen—rather than catering solely for the tastes of the officers—while at the same time creating a historical record of the era for future generations.

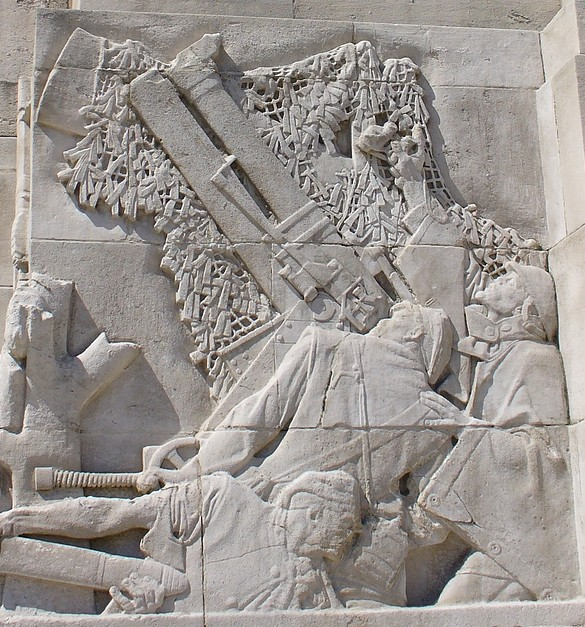
Part of the memorial's carved reliefs, showing gunners operating a trench howitzer

Jagger engaged the architect Lionel Pearson to design the stone structure of the memorial, and through June and July 1921 the RAWCF and the authorities considered the proposal. Jagger's model was similar to the eventual memorial, but had only two gunners at either end of an oblong memorial; the howitzer on the top was smaller than the eventual version, and pointed sideways, rather than lengthways along the pedestal. In reporting to the committee, Jagger said that he felt strongly that the design should unashamedly focus on the events of the war, noting that it "should in every sense be a war memorial". Jagger explained that the artillery had "terrific power" and was the "last word in force", and that the howitzer he had chosen was the only suitable weapon to symbolise those capabilities. During the design process, the committee presented Jagger with many suggestions. He gladly accepted their advice on technical matters related to artillery procedures and the appearance of the howitzer, but was protective of his artistic independence and would not brook suggestions which he felt would impinge on the quality of the work. There were concerns on the committee that the design would shock members of the public, especially women, but the RAWCF eventually voted 50 to 15 in favour of accepting the design and the proposed cost of £25,000. Jagger was formally awarded the contract for the memorial in March 1922.

Jagger at that time was preoccupied with the Anglo-Belgian Memorial in Brussels and did not begin work on the Royal Artillery memorial until October, at which point he made several changes to the proposed design, which he submitted to the RAWCF early the following year. The revised memorial would be a third larger than before, cruciform in plan, and guarded by three bronze soldiers. Jagger rotated the howitzer by 90 degrees, bringing it into line with the main axis of the base, pointing towards the Wellington Arch. After much discussion—including advice from Lutyens and Sir Reginald Blomfield representing the Royal Fine Arts Commission—Jagger agreed that the howitzer would point south to produce a pleasing silhouette from the park. The change also resolved an objection raised by the King about the "gloomy" figure on the front of the memorial staring down Constitution Hill towards Buckingham Palace. A year-long debate occurred within the RAWCF as to what inscription should be placed on the memorial, adding to the delay. Jagger made another change in early 1924, adding an effigy of a dead soldier to the fourth side of the memorial, in keeping with the soldiers on the other three sides. The proposal proved controversial. Although recumbent effigies were not uncommon on tombs and (to a lesser extent) war memorials, a sculpture of a dead soldier at eye level was an unusual and dramatic feature among First World War memorials; architects often preferred abstract, classical designs (such as the Cenotaph) or portrayed death through allegory. Jagger was adamant about the inclusion, even offering to pay for the casting of the additional figure himself. After considerable debate, the RAWCF agreed to the modification. Jagger's work continued to take longer than planned, partially due to shortages of staff, the need to approve each amendment to the plan, and practical problems on the site itself. The names of his models for three of the statues are known—William Fosten for the driver, another ex-gunner called Metcalfe for the ammunition carrier, and Lieutenant Eugene Paul Bennett, VC, who fought in the same regiment as Jagger, for the commander.

== Design and symbolism ==
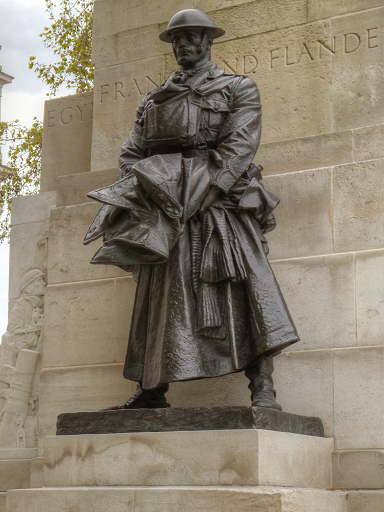
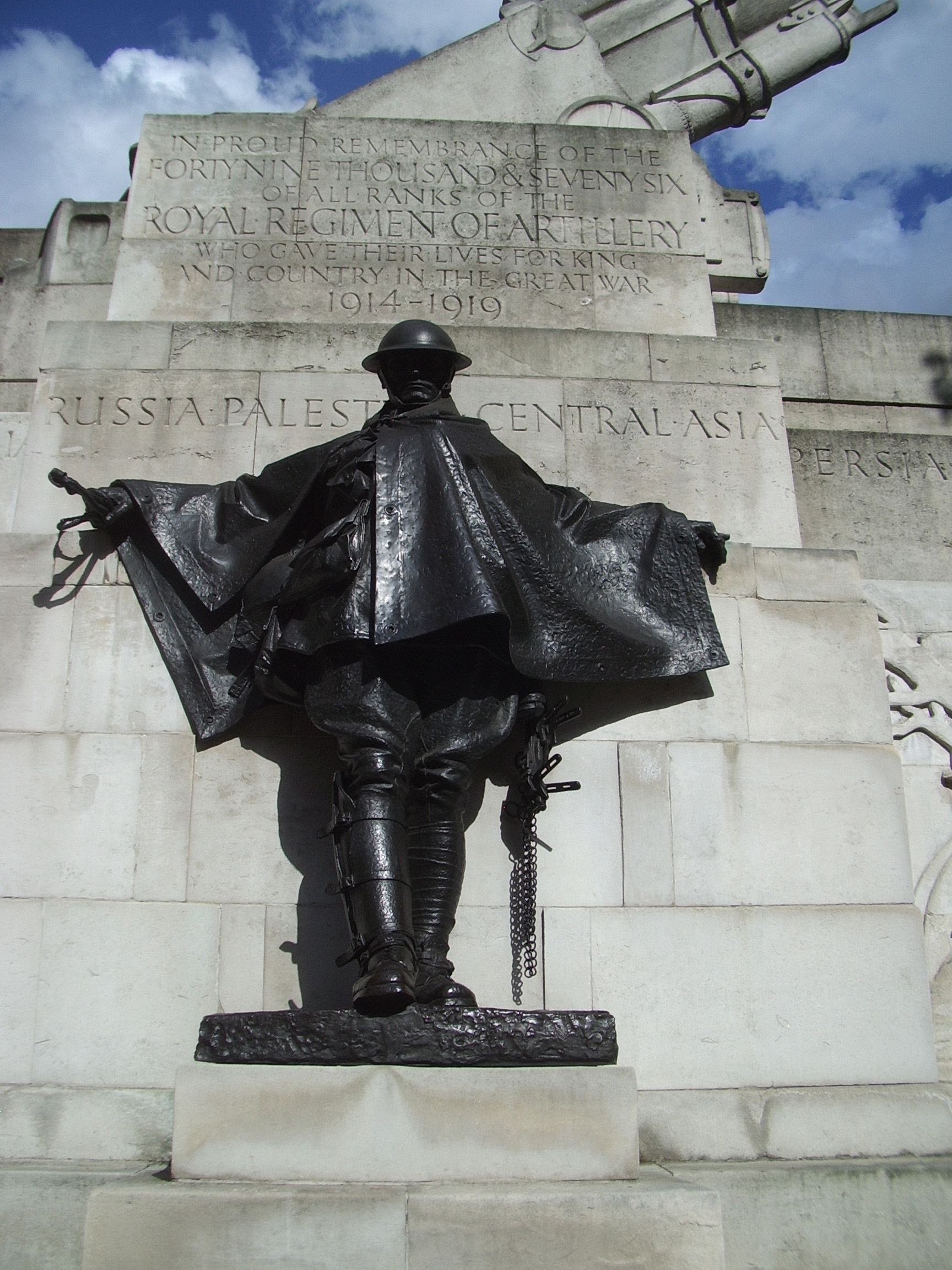
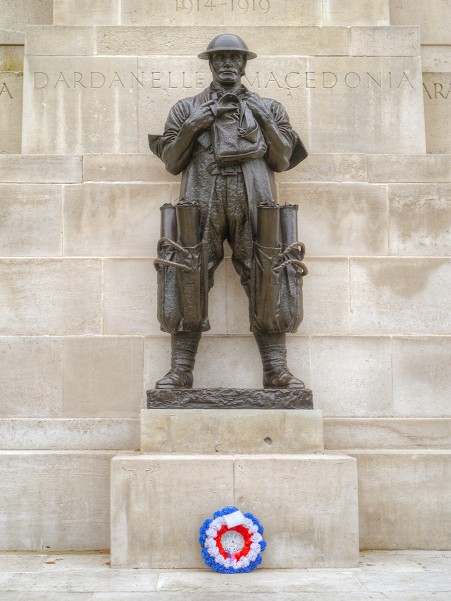
Bronze statues of an artillery captain (left), a driver (centre) and a shell carrier (right) are on the south side, west side and east side, respectively.

The Royal Artillery Memorial is located in what Malcolm Miles has termed the "leafy traffic island" of Hyde Park Corner in central London. It is one of several war memorials which dominate the roundabout and its surrounds; it is directly opposite the Wellington Arch while at the north end is another memorial to the Duke of Wellington in the form of an equestrian statue. Other memorials in the vicinity include the Machine Gun Corps Memorial, the Australian and New Zealand war memorials, and the Commonwealth Memorial Gates.

The Royal Artillery Memorial is 43 feet long, 21 feet wide and 30 feet high (13 metres by 6 metres by 9 metres); the pedestal and the one-third over-lifesize replica of a BL 9.2-inch howitzer, modelled on a gun in the Imperial War Museum, that sits on top of it are made of Portland stone. The plinth is in the form of a squat Roman cross. Cast by the A. B. Burton foundry, bronze figures are placed at the ends of each arm—an artillery captain holding a greatcoat at the front (facing south, below the barrel of the howitzer); a shell carrier on the east side; a driver wearing a heavy cape to the west; and to the north, a dead soldier on the north, his greatcoat thrown over him and his helmet resting on his chest. Carved stone reliefs show various detailed military scenes from the First World War—two on each side, one larger than the other—and the Royal Arms with the Artillery's cannon badge. The reliefs on the east side portray an action by heavy artillery and the crew of a howitzer; on the west side is an action involving horse artillery and a signaller and telephonist on the smaller relief. The memorial's main inscription on the west and east faces reads "In proud remembrance of the forty-nine thousand and seventy-six of all ranks of the Royal Regiment of Artillery who gave their lives for King and country in the Great War 1914—1919". Beneath the dead soldier is the inscription "Here was a royal fellowship of death", a quotation from William Shakespeare's Henry V, which was suggested by Jagger himself.

Audio description of the memorial

The memorial forms a sharp contrast with both the earlier monuments of the South African War and most monuments contemporary to the First World War. Memorials of the South African War typically included figures of soldiers, sometimes dying in conflict, but always heroically in a "beautiful death". Classical symbolism was often used to distance the event of death from the observer, as typified in William Robert Colton's work for the Worcester Boer War Memorial. Most First World War memorials reacted to the criticism of this approach by adopting cleaner architectural forms, but still retaining the ideal of a "beautiful death", an approach which can be seen at Lutyens's Southampton Cenotaph, the precursor to his more famous Cenotaph on Whitehall. These memorials frequently used abstract designs intended to remove the viewer from the real world, and focus them on an idealised sense of self-sacrifice. Soldiers in these memorials were still frequently depicted as Homeric warriors, and classical ideals and symbols remained popular, as can be seen at the Machine Gun Corps Memorial by Francis Derwent Wood, close to the Royal Artillery Memorial. Where dead soldiers were shown, they were depicted in an image of serenity and peace, often physically distanced from the viewer on a high platform, the entire effect enhanced by the silence that traditionally surrounds ceremonies at the Cenotaph.

The Royal Artillery Monument attempted a very different effect. Jagger takes a realist approach to his figures, embracing detailed images of military power with none of the classical symbolism of other monuments, or even Jagger's own pre-war pieces. The art historian Reginald Wilenski likens the memorial to the work of Frank Brangwyn, who focused on depicting the physical labour of soldiers and workers during the war. The memorial shows the three upright bronze figures stood at ease, rather than to attention; the driver leans back against the parapet, his cape hanging over his outstretched arms, suggesting an attitude of exhaustion or contemplation. The faceless, heavily laden statue of the fallen soldier appears less at rest than exhausted, pulled down as if by a great weight. At the same time, the sheer size of the memorial, including the oversized gun and larger-than-life bronze figures, exudes a sense of strength and power; the figures are stocky, confident and imposing. This contributes to the sense of masculinity that pervades the work, from the phallic image of the howitzer, to the solid, muscular figures of the gunners.

Despite the realist nature of the bronze statues in the design, commentators have often also noted the dehumanising aspects of the memorial. Its sheer size and the bulk of the howitzer serve to distance the observer, which—according to the art historian John Glaves-Smith—depersonalises the soldiers in a similar way to the Cubist war paintings of Wyndham Lewis and Richard Nevinson. The carved stone reliefs have an aggressive, hostile quality to them, a consequence of their focus on surface detail at the expense of the humans in the design. When questioned about his lifelike depictions, Jagger said that the "experience in the trenches persuaded me of the necessity for frankness and truth". According to Glaves-Smith, the memorial uses themes of "endurance and sacrifice, not dynamism and conflict", and thus speaks to its audience about the experience of war in a way that the Cenotaph, for example, does not.

== Critical reception ==
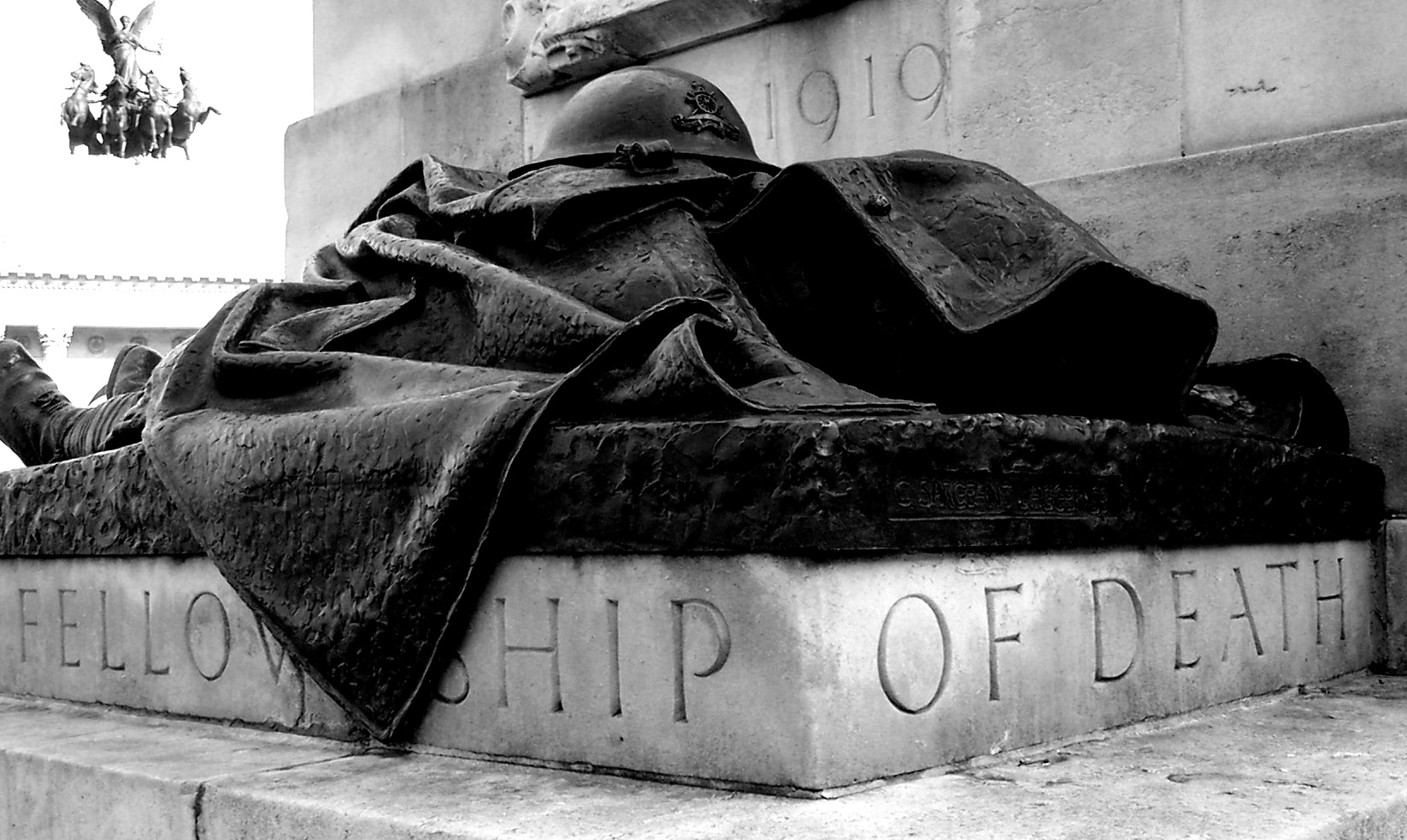
The bronze sculpture of a fallen artilleryman

The Royal Artillery Memorial has been the subject of much critical discussion since its inception. Although the RAWCF was pleased with its memorial, some members disapproved of the design and of the dead soldier in particular. Some felt that it was too graphic, or that it would be distressing to relatives and others who should have been consoled by the memorial, while a group of former artillerymen felt that any recumbent figure should be of a man just shot down so as to present a more heroic image. Charles ffoulkes, the inaugural curator of the Imperial War Museum, was more impressed, and described the corpse as "a poignant and tremendous statement of fact which unconsciously makes the onlooker raise his hat". The figure was shocking to a public who were unused to graphic images of the war due to censorship.

After the unveiling, a vigorous debate occurred in the British newspapers about the memorial. The Times was critical, comparing it unfavourably to the Cenotaph, while the Daily Mail highlighted the cost of the monument, and argued that the money could have been better spent on directly caring for injured veterans. Both the dead soldier and the howitzer drew particular comment; the art critic Selwyn Image complained about having any sort of artillery gun on the monument, while Lord Curzon was quoted as describing the howitzer as "a toad squatting, which is about to spit fire out of its mouth ... nothing more hideous could ever be conceived". Modernists such as Roger Fry criticised the conventional, secure structure that underpins the memorial. Editorials in The Times and The Builder both likened the howitzer to a children's toy, complaining that the gun did not lend itself to recreation in art. The Builder was sharply critical of the close relationship between the sculptor and the client, which it viewed as the root cause, believing that Jagger had given the artillerymen far too much influence over artistic matters.

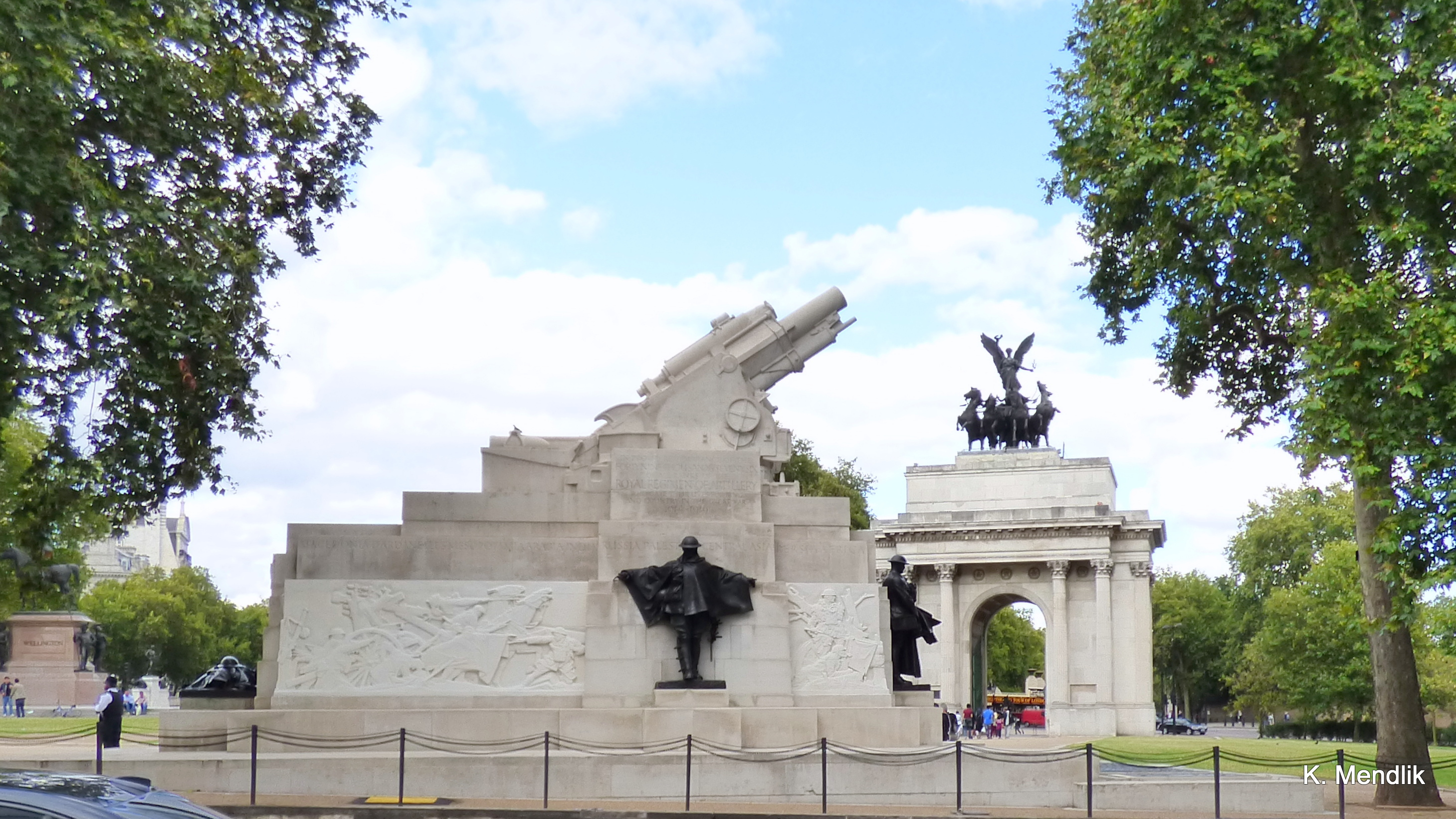
The west side of the memorial, showing the over-lifesize howitzer, with the Wellington Arch in the background

Other opinions were more positive. The Manchester Guardian noted that the frankness of the portrayal was a "terrible revelation long overdue", and hoped that veterans would be able to show the monument to their wives and children as a way of explaining the events of the war. Ex-servicemen were quoted by the newspaper as reminiscing about the war as they examined the statue, and remarking on how the bronze figures had captured the reality of their time in the artillery. The Illustrated London News reported how, two days after the official ceremony, a crowd had gathered in the rain just before dawn to conduct a small ceremony at the memorial; the newspaper felt that this said more about the quality of the memorial than the more negative writings of art critics. These voices eventually held sway, and the memorial came to be popularly termed "the special Cenotaph of the Gunners", Lord Edward Gleichen praising it in 1928 as "a strikingly imaginative and most worthy representation". By the 1930s, it was one of the best-known monuments in Europe.

The memorial's reputation diminished in the post-war period. The art critic Geoffrey Grigson echoed Lord Curzon's comments, complaining in 1980 that it was a "squat toad of foolish stone". A renewed focus on Jagger's works, including the Royal Artillery memorial, in the 1980s led to a fresh reappraisal of the piece; the most recent critical work on the memorial has described it as a "work of the highest quality and distinction". Alan Borg, an art historian and Director of the Imperial War Museum, described the work in 1991 as "undoubtedly" Jagger's masterpiece, noting the quality of the sculptural work which makes it "one of the outstanding examples of 20th-century British art" and "perhaps the only war memorial" to be recognised as intrinsically important in its own right.

The memorial enjoyed a still higher profile in the 21st century. The architectural historian Gavin Stamp compared its quality to the memorials of the Commonwealth War Graves Commission, and in 2004, the art critic Brian Sewell pronounced the Royal Artillery Memorial "the greatest sculpture of the twentieth century". Historic England, in the memorial's entry on the National Heritage List for England, remarks that the memorial "is now internationally recognised as one of the finest memorials to have been erected anywhere after the First World War. Its combination of sculptural force, boldness of conception, vivid narrative and humanity makes the memorial pre-eminent", and notes that "the inclusion of an over-life size corpse was boldly direct and is without parallel on any major British memorial". The Pevsner Architectural Guide for the area praises the detail in Jagger's sculptures, especially the corpse, and notes that the memorial is "now recognised as a masterpiece of British 20th century sculpture".

== Later history ==
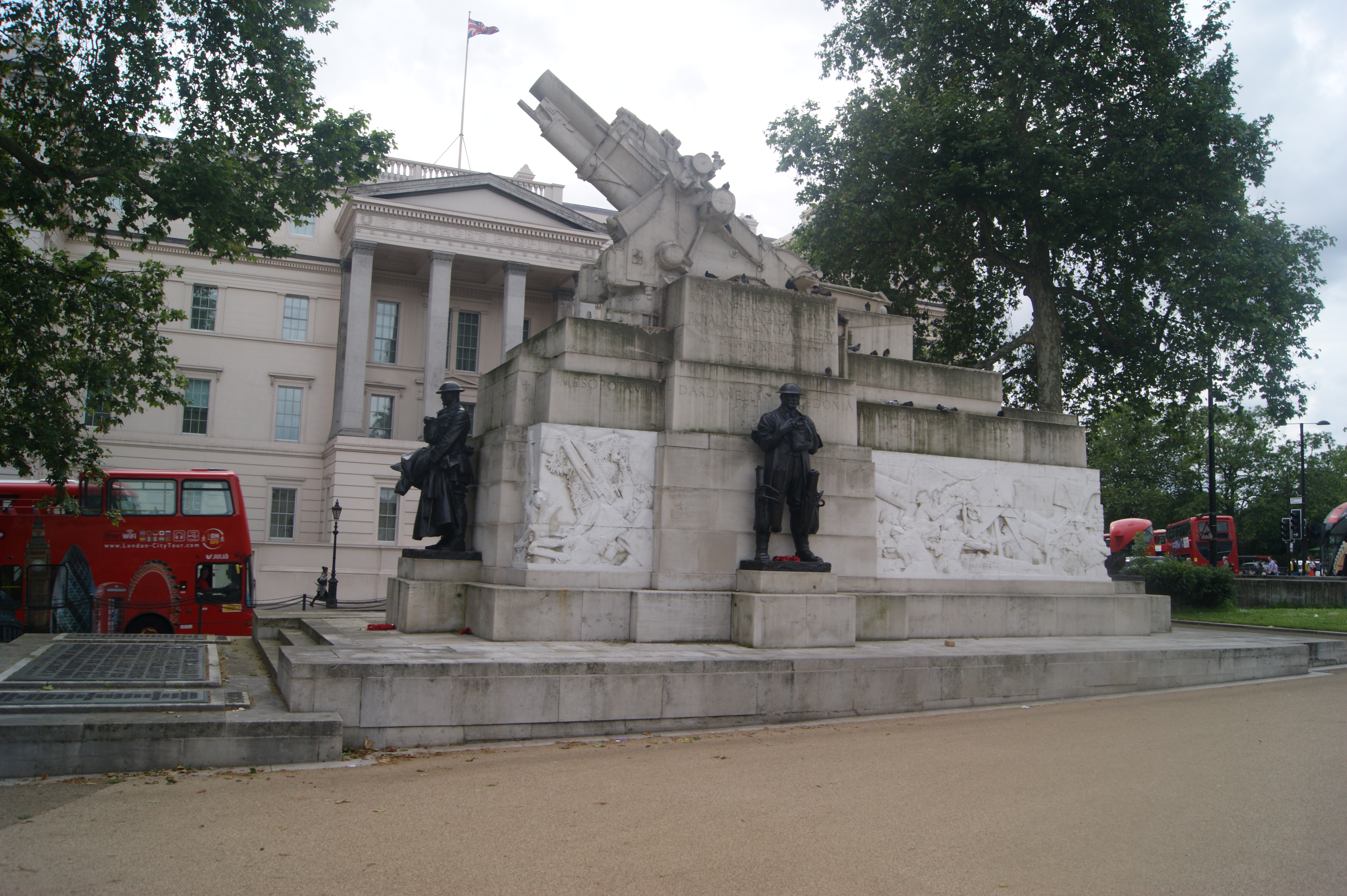
The memorial in 2016, following the 2011 cleaning and restoration work; the building behind is The Lanesborough Hotel.

The unveiling was originally scheduled for 28 June 1925 but early in 1925 Jagger's most capable assistant resigned, leaving Jagger to complete the work alone. He advised the RAWCF that it could not be completed in time without sacrificing quality. The memorial was eventually unveiled four months late on 18 October 1925 by Prince Arthur and the Reverend Alfred Jarvis, Chaplain-General to the Forces. Despite the delay, the RAWCF and Jagger parted on very good terms, the committee exceptionally pleased with the final memorial. Such was the toll on Jagger that after its unveiling he suspended work on all his other projects for six months to recuperate. Although at first the memorial met conflicting opinions, it further bolstered Jagger's professional reputation. He was awarded the Royal British Society of Sculptors' gold medal in 1926 and was admitted as an associate of the society later that year.

A set of bronze tablets was added to the south of the memorial in 1949, lying on a flat plinth which replaced a set of steps. Designed by Darcy Braddell, the addition commemorates 29,924 Royal Artillerymen who were killed in the Second World War. They were unveiled by Princess Elizabeth (later Queen Elizabeth II). Over the years, pollution and water penetration caused damage to the bronzes and stonework. English Heritage conducted a major restoration of the memorial during 2011, completed in time for Armistice Day.

In 1970 the memorial was designated a Grade II* listed building, and in July 2014 it was one of five memorials in London to be upgraded to Grade I status to mark the centenary of the First World War. Listed building status provides legal protection from demolition or modification. Grade II* is applied to "particularly important buildings of more than special interest" and applied to about 5.5 per cent of listed buildings; Grade I is reserved for structures of "the greatest historic interest", and applies to around 2.5 per cent of listed buildings. The list entry notes its group value with the multiple other monuments on the Hyde Park Corner island (many of which are also listed), including the Wellington Arch and the multiple other war memorials.

== See also ==
- Grade I listed buildings in the City of Westminster
- Grade I listed war memorials in England
- List of public art in Hyde Park, London § Hyde Park Corner, for other monuments in the vicinity

== Bibliography ==
- Abousnnouga, Gill and Machin, David. (2008) "Defence Discourse I: the Visual Institutionalization of Discourses in War Monuments", in Mayr (ed) (2008).
- Abousnnouga, Gill and Machin, David. (2013) The Language of War Monuments. London: Bloomsbury Academic. ISBN 9781623563332.
- Archer, Geoff. (2009) The Glorious Dead: Figurative Sculpture of British First World War Memorials. Kirstead, Norfolk: Frontier Publishing. ISBN 9781872914381.
- Bailey, Jonathan B. A. (2004) Field Artillery and Firepower. Annapolis, Maryland: Naval Institute Press. ISBN 9781591140290.
- Black, Jonathan. (2004a) "Thanks for the Memory: War Memorials, Spectatorship and the Trajectories of Commemoration 1919–2001", in Saunders (ed) (2004).
- Black, Jonathan. (2004b) "'Who Dies if England Live?' Masculinity, the Problematics and the Image of the Ordinary Soldier in British War Art, c.1915–1928", in Caunce, Mazierska, Sydney-Smith and Walton (eds) (2004).
- Boorman, Derek. (2005) A Century of Remembrance: One Hundred Outstanding British War Memorials. Barnsley: Pen and Sword Books ISBN 9781844153169.
- Borg, Alan. (1991) War Memorials: From Antiquity to the Present. London: Leo Cooper ISBN 9780850523638.
- Bowdler, Roger H. and Brindle, Steven P. (2015) Wellington Arch, Marble Arch and Six Great War Memorials. (English Heritage Guidebooks) London: English Heritage ISBN 9781910907054.
- Bradley, Simon and Pevsner, Nikolaus. (2003) London 6: Westminster. (The Buildings of England) New Haven, Connecticut: Yale University Press ISBN 9780300095951.
- Caunce, Steven, Ewa Mazierska, Susan Sydney-Smith and John K. Walton (eds) (2004) Relocating Britishness. Manchester: Manchester University Press. ISBN 9780719070266.
- Carden-Coyne, Ana. (2009) Reconstructing the Body: Classicism, Modernism, and the First World War. Oxford: Oxford University Press ISBN 9780199546466.
- Codell, Julie F. (ed) (2008) The Political Economy of Art: Making the Nation of Culture. Cranbury, New Jersey: Associated University Presses. ISBN 9780838641682.
- Compton, Ann. (ed) (1985a) Charles Sargeant Jagger: War and Peace Sculpture. London: Imperial War Museum. ISBN 9780901627315.
- Compton, Ann. (1985b) "A Sculptural Biography," in Compton (ed) (1985a).
- Cooper, Charles Samuel. (1928) The Outdoor Monuments of London: Statues, Memorial Buildings, Tablets and War Memorials. London: The Homeland Association OCLC 2067198.
- Corke, Jim. (2005) War Memorials in Britain. Oxford: Shire Publications ISBN 9780747806264.
- Curl, James Stevens. (1985) "The Royal Artillery Memorial at Hyde Park Corner", in Compton (ed) (1985a).
- Dyer, Geoff. (2009) The Missing of the Somme. London: Phoenix ISBN 9780753827543.
- Glaves-Smith, John. (1985) "Realism and Propaganda in the Work of Charles Sargeant Jagger and their Relationship to Artistic Tradition", in Compton (ed) (1985a).
- King, Alex. (1998) Memorials of the Great War in Britain: The Symbolism and Politics of Remembrance Oxford: Berg Publishers ISBN 9781859739884.
- Matthews, Peter. (2012) London's Statues and Monuments. Oxford: Shire Library ISBN 9780747807988.
- Mayr, Andrea. (ed) (2008) Language and Power: An Introduction to Institutional Discourse. London: Continuum. ISBN 9780826487438.
- Miles, Malcolm. (2004) Urban Avant-Gardes: Art, Architecture and Change. Abingdon: Routledge. ISBN 9780415266871.
- Quinlan, Mark. (2005) British War Memorials. Hereford: Authors Online ISBN 9780755201860.
- Saunders, Nicholas J. (ed) (2004) Matters of Conflict: Material Culture, Memory and the First World War. Abingdon: Routledge. ISBN 9780415280532.
- Skelton, Tim and Gliddon, Gerald. (2009) Lutyens and the Great War. London: Frances Lincoln ISBN 9780711228788.
- Stephenson, Andrew P. "Palimpsestic Promenades: Memorial Environments and the Consumption of Space in Post-1918 London", in Codell (ed) (2008).
- Ward-Jackson, Philip. (2011) Public Sculpture of Historic Westminster: Volume 1. Liverpool: Liverpool University Press ISBN 9781846316913.
- Windrow, Martin. (2008) Osprey Men-at-Arms: A Celebration. Botley: Osprey Publishing. ISBN 9781846034374.
