= Polly Hope =

British artist, designer and author

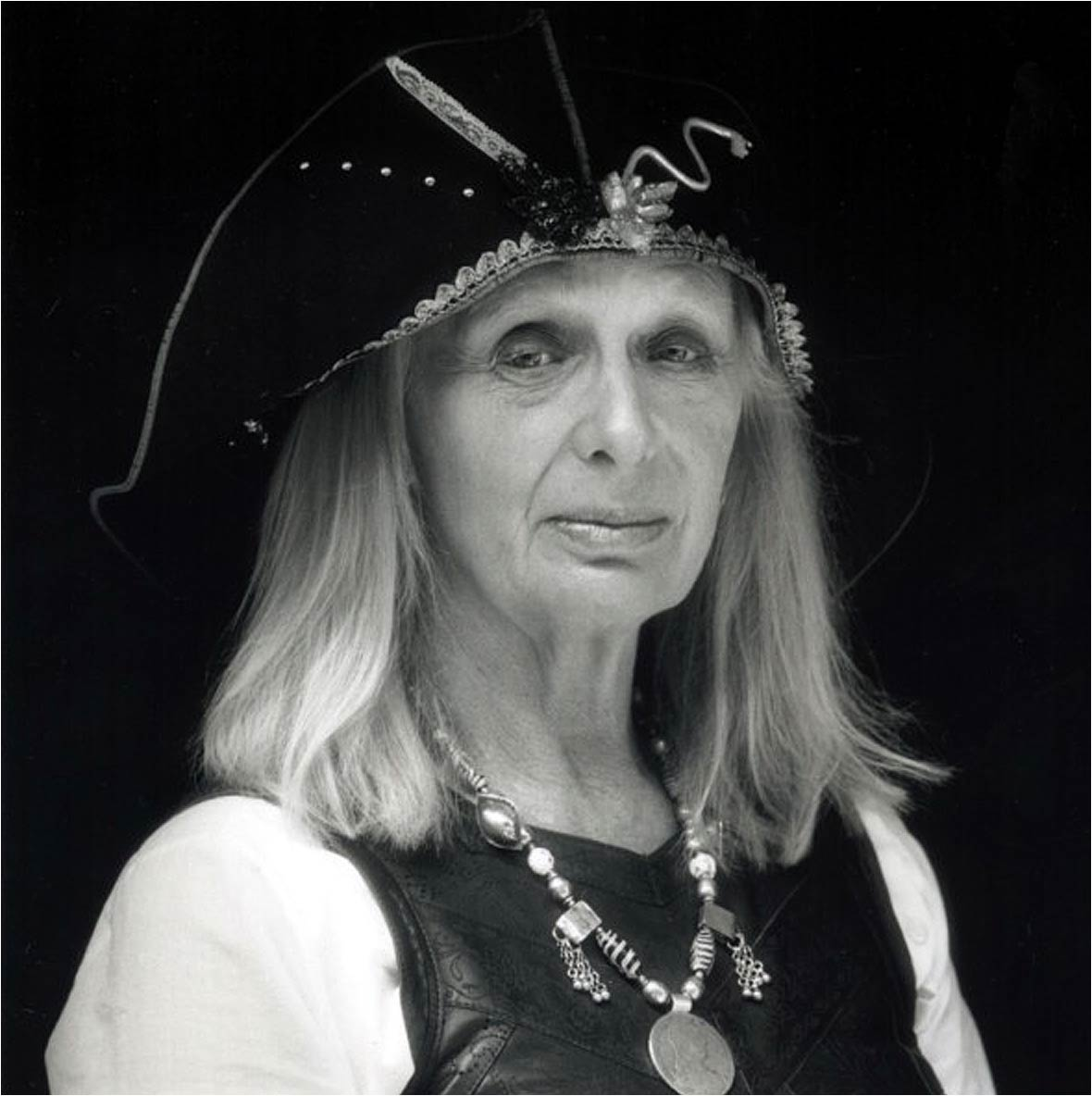
Polly Hope - 2000

Polly Hope (21 June 1933 – 20 November 2013) was a British artist, designer and author. Hope created artworks in a variety of mediums, including paintings, portraits, sculpture, textiles and ceramics. Examples of her artworks are in the permanent collection of the Victoria and Albert Museum.

== Biography ==
Hope was born in Colchester, England and lived between her London home in Spitalfields, and her house on the Greek island of Rhodes. She trained as a ballet dancer and joined the Festival Ballet before deciding to become an artist. She studied at the Heatherley School of Fine Art, at Chelsea Polytechnic from 1950 to 1952, and then the Slade School of Fine Art. Her first solo exhibition was in 1968, in Milan, and she held further shows in London, New York, Stuttgart, Athens, Dallas, Melbourne, Amsterdam, Cyprus, Lisbon, Los Angeles and Mexico. Although Hope trained as a painter and sculptor, she undertook a number of public commissions for large scale quilted fabrics. These included works for the headquarters of the NMB Bank in Amsterdam, for Cwmbran and for a church in Whitstable.

=== Artwork of note ===
- The Shakespeare's Globe. Hope designed a ceramic zodiac mural and four corner sculptures which wrap around the towers of the Globe Theatre complex. Much of her artwork still hangs throughout the building and stairwells.
- At The Barbican Centre in London, Hope painted the since lost 'polka-dot' interiors.
- She was commissioned for a portrait of Roy Strong which is in the Victoria and Albert Museum collection.
- Two silk headscarves made for Van Laack are held within the Victoria and Albert Museum collection

Hope wrote three books under the alias Maryann Forrest. Her first novel 'Here (Away From It All). It was described by The Guardian as an 'adult Lord of the Flies' and it was highly praised by Anthony Burgess as

a terrifying and true study of the total lack of rapprochement that can occur in a Mediterranean community between the indigenous people and the inevitable expatriate bunch

== Personal life ==
Hope was married for 30 years to John Nugent Hope, an artist. She was subsequently married to Theo Crosby, an architect best remembered for his work to reconstruct Shakespeare's Globe Theatre on London's Bankside. She is survived by her son, Augustine Hope, and grandchildren, Gabriel and Annie.

Hope's father was British Army Officer Hugh Stockwell, who commanded the Anglo-French ground forces during the Suez Crisis. and was Deputy Supreme Allied Commander of NATO From 1960 to 1964.

Hope died of cancer in November 2013.
