= Machine Gun Corps Memorial =

Memorial in Hyde Park Corner, London, England

- United Kingdom
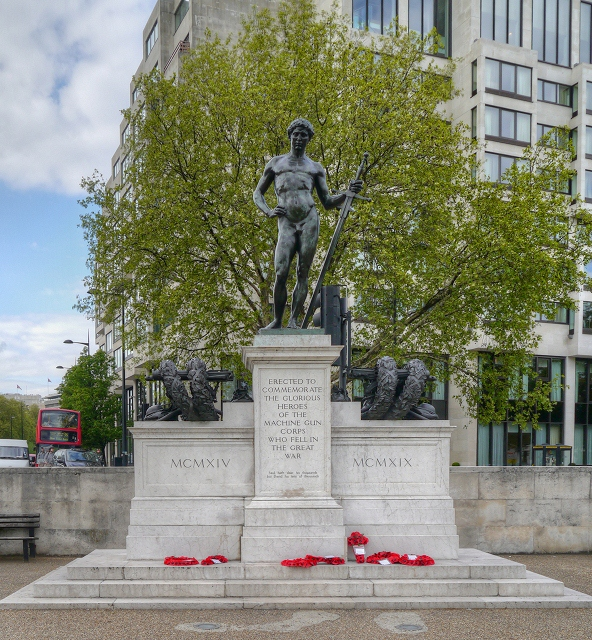
- For Machine Gun Corps men who died in World War I
- Unveiled: 1925
- Location: 51.5032°N 0.1508°W; London, United Kingdom
- Designed by: Francis Derwent Wood

The Machine Gun Corps Memorial, also known as The Boy David, is a memorial to the casualties of the Machine Gun Corps in the First World War. It is located on the north side of the traffic island at Hyde Park Corner in London, near the Wellington Arch, an Equestrian statue of the Duke of Wellington, the Royal Artillery Memorial, the New Zealand War Memorial, and the Australian War Memorial.

== Description ==
The central column of light grey marble is topped with a 9 feet (2.7 m) high bronze statue of a nude David by Francis Derwent Wood. The beautiful youth stands in a classical contrapposto pose, with one hand on his hip and the other resting on Goliath's oversized sword. To either side, on a lower flanking plinth of the same marble, is a bronze model of a Vickers machine gun, wreathed in laurels (some sources state that the Vickers guns are real examples, cased in bronze, but the official English Heritage listing casts doubt on that suggestion).

The inscription on the main column reads: ERECTED TO/ COMMEMORATE/ THE GLORIOUS/ HEROES/ OF THE/ MACHINE GUN/ CORPS/ WHO FELL IN/ THE GREAT/ WAR, and then below, a Biblical quotation from 1 Samuel 18:7: "Saul has slain his thousands/ but David his tens of thousands". The plinths to either side bear the dates MCMXIV and MCMXIX. A further inscription on the rear records that the Machine Gun Corps was formed in October 1915 and disbanded in 1922; in that time, some 11,500 officers and 159,000 other ranks served in the Corps, of whom 1,120 officers and 1,671 other ranks were killed, and 2,881 officers and 45,377 other ranks wounded, missing or prisoners-of-war. The high casualty rate of the Corps, nearly 30%, arose from the exposed position from which it typically fought, leading to its nickname, "The Suicide Club".

== History ==
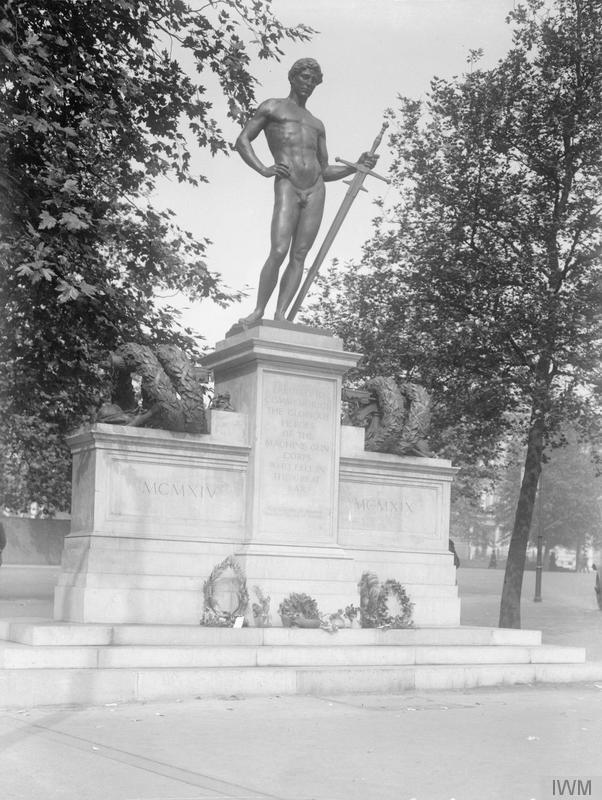
Machine Gun Corps Memorial before the Second World War, in its original position

The memorial was originally erected next to Grosvenor Place, near Hyde Park Corner, and unveiled on 10 May 1925 by Prince Arthur, Duke of Connaught and Strathearn. Four former members of the Corps who received the Victoria Cross – Arthur Henry Cross, Reginald Graham, Allan Ker, and William Allison White – placed a wreath after a dedication by the Chaplain-General to the Forces Alfred Jarvis. The memorial was controversial, as some interpreted the beautiful statue with its accompanying Vickers guns, and the reference to slaying hundreds and thousands, as glorifying war. There were letters in The Times and discussion in the House of Commons. Despite these interpretations, Derwent Wood wanted to depict the true nature of war, and in particular the solitary conflict of the machine gunner. Although already in his 40s, he had enlisted in 1915 to serve as an orderly in the Royal Army Medical Corps; he designed masks to be worn by soldiers with facial disfigurements caused by their wounds, and was fully aware of the horrors of modern mechanical warfare.

The memorial was dismantled due to roadworks in 1945, and was not reconstructed for many years. It was rededicated at its present location, in the central section of Hyde Park Corner, in 1963. It received a Grade II listing in 1970, and was upgraded to Grade II* in July 2014. The Machine Gun Corps Old Comrades' Association holds an annual observance in May and a memorial service on Remembrance Sunday in November each year.

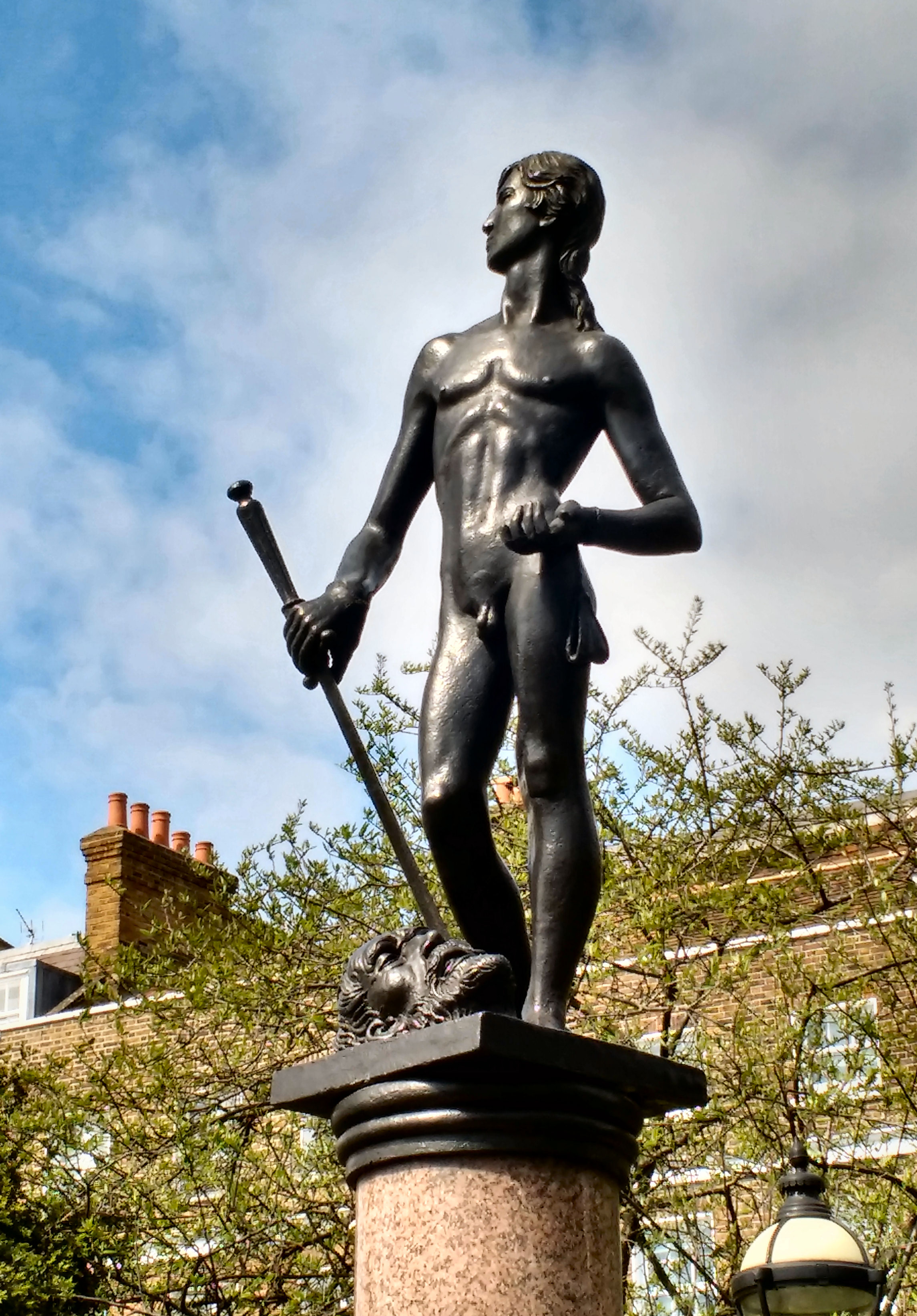
Edward Bainbridge Copnall's The Boy David on the Chelsea Embankment

A bronze cast of the statue by Derwent Wood is held by the National Gallery of Victoria in Australia.

A variant sculpture of the Boy David by Edward Bainbridge Copnall, inspired by Derwent Wood's statue, was erected on another memorial to the dead of the Machine Gun Corps at Cheyne Walk on Chelsea Embankment. The original statue was stolen in 1969, and a fibreglass replica unveiled in 1975.

The Machine Gun Corps had several branches. The Cavalry Branch has a war memorial in Folkestone, near the Corps' barracks at Shorncliffe.

== See also ==
- Grade II* listed war memorials in England
