= Sandham Memorial Chapel =

Historic chapel in Burghclere, Hampshire, England

Coordinates: 51.34467°N 1.33622°W

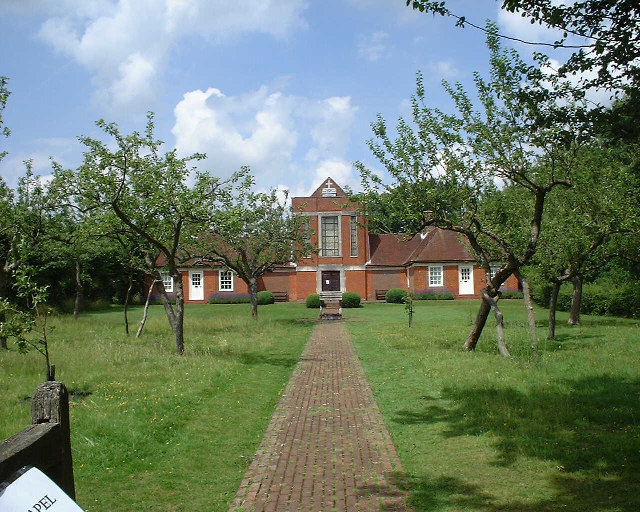
- Sandham Memorial Chapel, Burghclere.
- Interactive map of the Sandham Memorial Chapel area

General information
- Location: Burghclere, Hampshire, England
- Owner: National Trust

Design and construction
- Architect: Lionel Godfrey Pearson

Website
- www.nationaltrust.org.uk/sandham-memorial-chapel

Listed Building – Grade I
- Official name: Sandham Memorial Chapel
- Designated: 18 May 1984
- Reference no.: 1339741

Sandham Memorial Chapel is in the village of Burghclere, Hampshire, England. It is a Grade I listed, 1920s decorated chapel, designed by Lionel Pearson. The chapel was built to accommodate a series of paintings by the English artist Stanley Spencer. It was commissioned by Mary and John Louis Behrend (1881–1972) as a memorial to Mary's brother, Lieutenant Henry Willoughby Sandham who died of illness contracted in Macedonia after the First World War. The chapel is surrounded by lawns and orchards, with views of Watership Down.

It is run by the National Trust and is open to the public.

== Paintings ==
Spencer's series of seventeen paintings was inspired by his own experiences during the First World War, in which he served as an orderly with the Royal Army Medical Corps, first at Beaufort War Hospital in Bristol, and then on the Macedonian front, where he was subsequently transferred to the infantry. He was influenced by Giotto’s Arena Chapel murals in Padua. He wanted to paint frescoes too, but the environmental conditions were not appropriate. Upon being commissioned to paint the murals for the chapel, Spencer was heard to exclaim “What Ho, Giotto!” The subsequent paintings were commissioned in 1923, with Spencer moving to Burghclere in 1926 to work in situ. The series was completed in 1932. It is dominated by the Resurrection scene behind the altar, in which dozens of British soldiers lay the white wooden crosses that marked their graves at the feet of a distant Christ. The series chronicles Spencer's everyday experiences of the war rather than any scenes of action. When the art historian R. H. Wilenski saw the recently completed sequence, he wrote of his sense "that every one of the thousand memories recorded had been driven into the artist's consciousness like a sharp-pointed nail".

== Name ==
The Chapel is consecrated as The Oratory of All Saints and only became officially recognised by its colloquial name Sandham Memorial Chapel following the National Trust's takeover of the property. Spencer would refer to it as his "Holy-Box", whilst the architect and patrons would privately refer to it as Spencer's "God-Box". Meanwhile, John and Mary Behrend's children pejoratively called it the "biscuit factory", in response to its "municipal" characteristics.

== Bibliography ==
- Behrend, George (1965). Stanley Spencer at Burghclere. London: MacDonald. ISBN 978-0901845030.
- Gough, Paul (2006). Stanley Spencer: Journey to Burghclere. Bristol: Sansom. ISBN 1-904537-46-4.
- Gough, Paul (2017). The Holy Box. The genesis of Stanley Spencer’s Sandham Memorial Chapel. Bristol: Sansom. ISBN 978-1-911408-09-3.
- Haycock, David Boyd (2009). A Crisis of Brilliance: Five Young British Artists and the Great War. London: Old Street Publishing. ISBN 978-1-905847-84-6.
- Bromwell, Tom (2014). The God-Box of Burghclere. National Trust Historic Houses and Collections Annual, Apollo Magazine
