= Van Laack =

German fashion company

- Native name: Van Laack GmbH
- Type: Private
- Founded: 1881; 145 years ago
- Founder: Heinrich van Laack
- Headquarters: Mönchengladbach, Germany
- Owner: Christian von Daniels (51%); Christoph Neizert (49%)
- Number of employees: 207 (2023)
- Website: vanlaack.com

Van Laack is a German shirt maker and fashion company headquarted in Mönchengladbach. Founded in 1881, Van Laack had several owners over the last century, until being acquired in 2002 by Christian von Daniels (51%) and Christoph Neizert (49%), who owns the majority stake.
