= Lionel Pearson =

British architect (1879-1953)

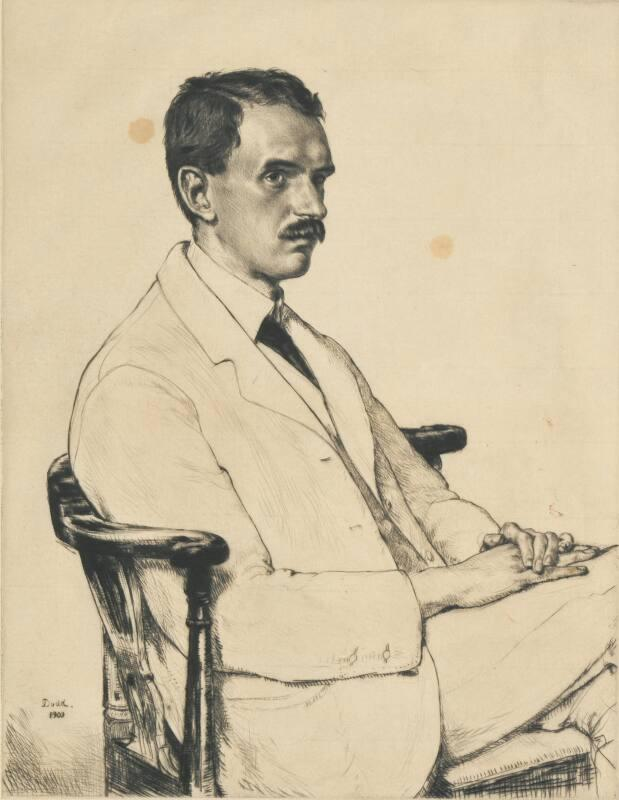
Portrait of Lionel Pearson by Francis Dodd

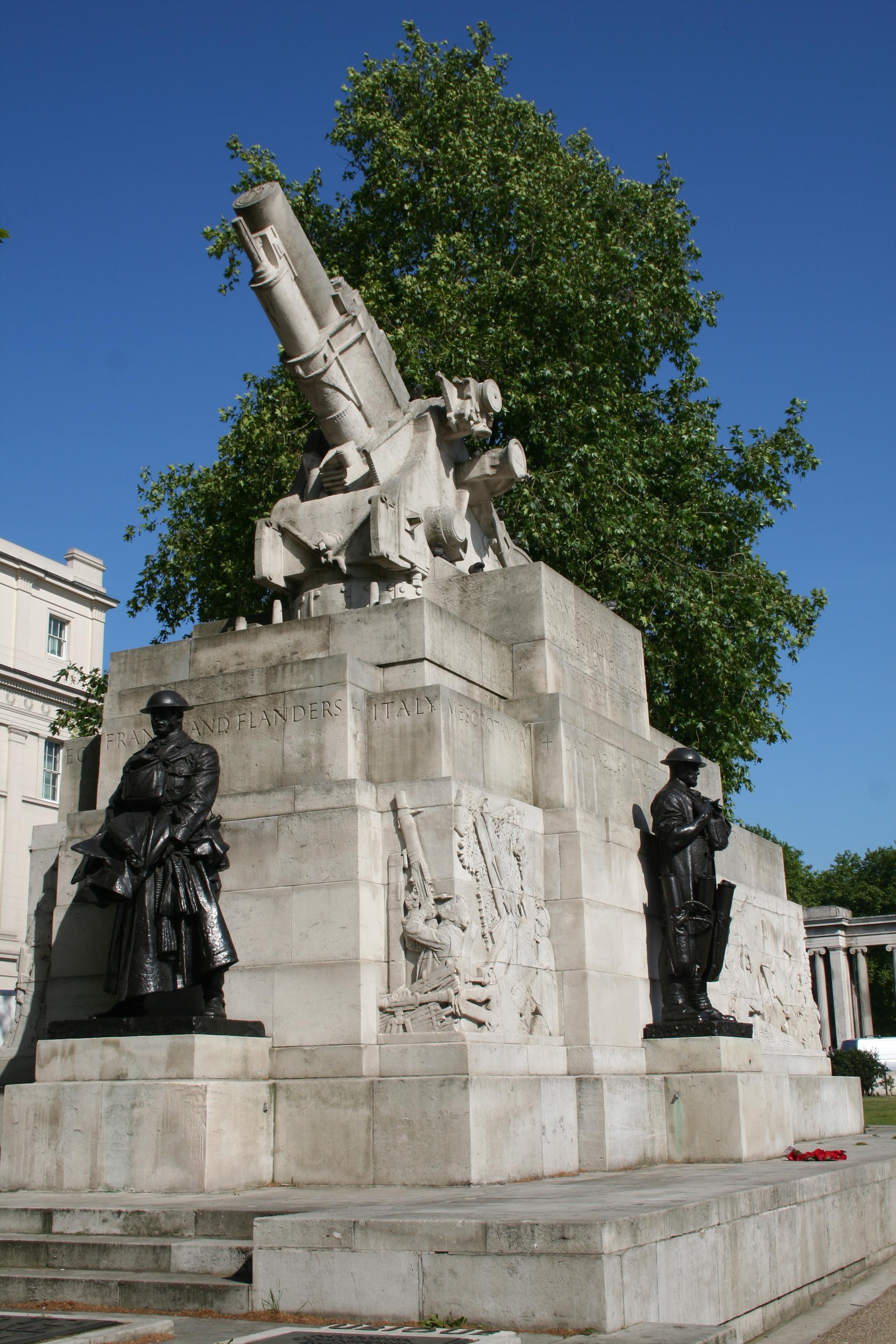
Royal Artillery Memorial

Lionel Godfrey Pearson (29 October 1879 – 19 March 1953) was a British architect, best known for the Grade I listed Royal Artillery Memorial, which he designed with the sculptor Charles Sargeant Jagger.

== Biography ==
Pearson was educated at Manchester Grammar School. He trained in Liverpool and then practiced in London, where from 1913, he worked in partnership with Henry Percy Adams and Charles Holden. Earlier work in London from 1901 was with Edward Schroeder Prior.

During the First World War, he served in the Royal Army Medical Corps.

He was the architect of Stanley Spencer's Sandham Memorial Chapel.

His architectural work included a number of hospitals. These included the new Westminster Hospital (1939), Royal Westminster Ophthalmic Hospital (1928), Southend Hospital (1932), and the Mineral Water Hospital in Bath.

Pearson married Melinda Elizabeth Osborne in 1932. His obituary was published in The Times on 27 March 1953.
