= Equestrian statue of the Duke of Wellington, Hyde Park Corner =

Statue in London by Joseph Edgar Boehm

Equestrian statue of Arthur Wellesley, 1st Duke of Wellington
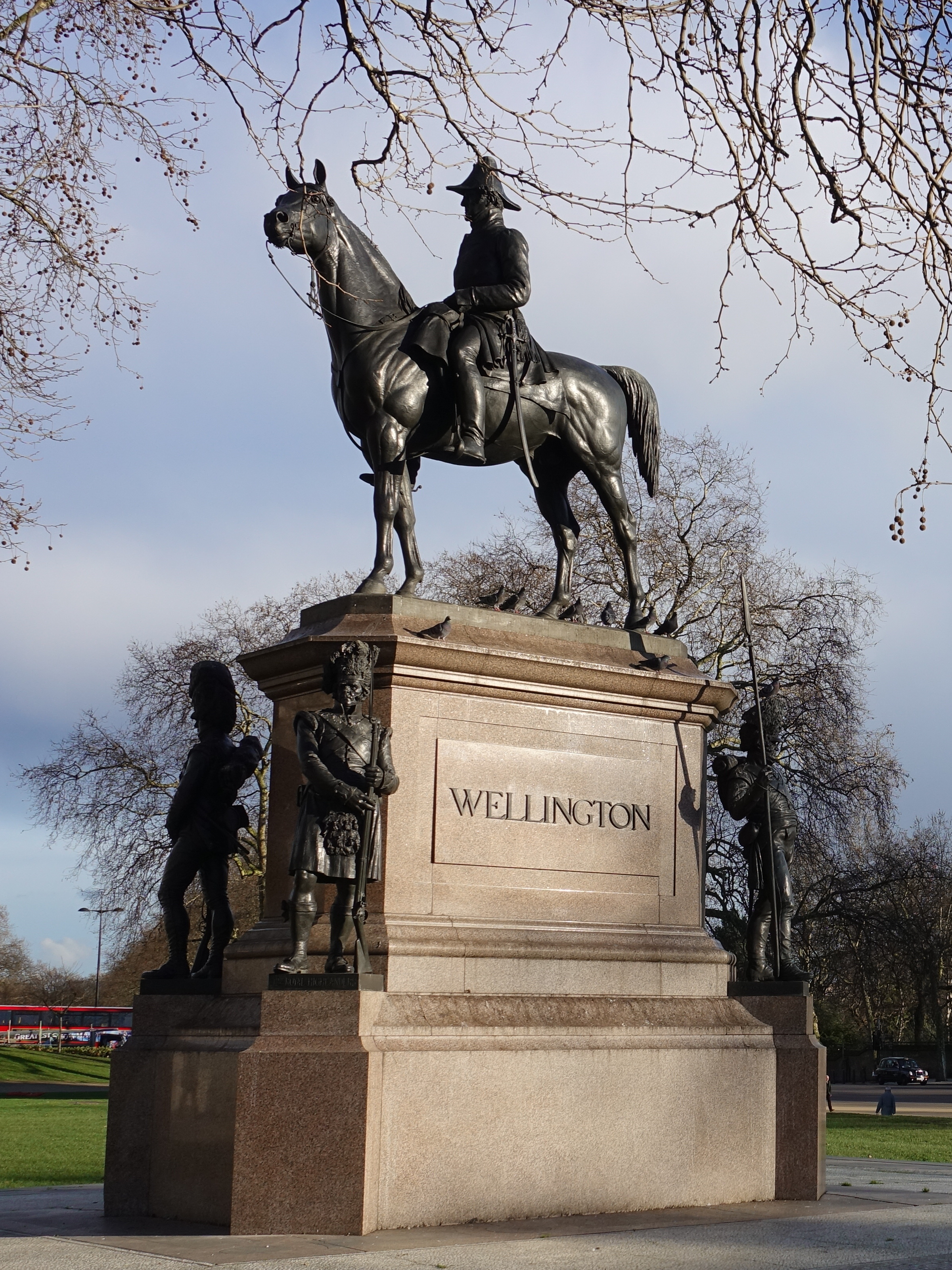
- Artist: Joseph Edgar Boehm
- Year: 1888
- Medium: Bronze (sculpture) and granite (plinth)
- Location: Hyde Park Corner, London

Listed Building – Grade II
- Official name: Wellington Monument
- Designated: 14 January 1970
- Reference no.: 1231514

An Equestrian statue of the Duke of Wellington, stands on the north side of Hyde Park Corner, London. The open space in which it stands, now the centre of a large roundabout, was once called Wellington Place.

== Description and history ==
The statue portrays the Iron Duke on a campaign, mounted on his horse Copenhagen, with all hooves planted on the ground. It was executed in bronze by the sculptor Joseph Boehm and unveiled in 1888. The figures at the corners of the pedestal representative British soldiers, a Grenadier, a Scottish Highlander, an Irish Dragoon and a Welsh Fusilier. Wellington has a telescope in his right hand.

The statue faces Apsley House, which was Wellington's London home. This gives the unintended impression that the Duke's back is turned on the processional way that runs through the open space in which the statue stands. The bronze statue stands on a plinth of pink Peterhead granite from Stirlinghill quarry, near Boddam, Aberdeenshire, Scotland. The grey dais forming the base is made of Aberdeen granite from the Rubislaw quarry, Aberdeen. The bronze came from captured French cannons. On one side of the plinth is inscribed WELLINGTON and on the other 1769–1852 in raised bronze characters.

An earlier, 1846 equestrian statue of the Duke, by Matthew Cotes Wyatt, once surmounted the nearby Wellington Arch. It was considered to be too large for the arch and was removed in 1882–83. It is now located at Aldershot Camp, Hampshire. Boehm's statue was commissioned to compensate for the removal of Wyatt's. The current statue is not to be confused with the nearby Wellington Monument, the first monument to the Duke of Wellington, which stands 150 metres away in Hyde Park.

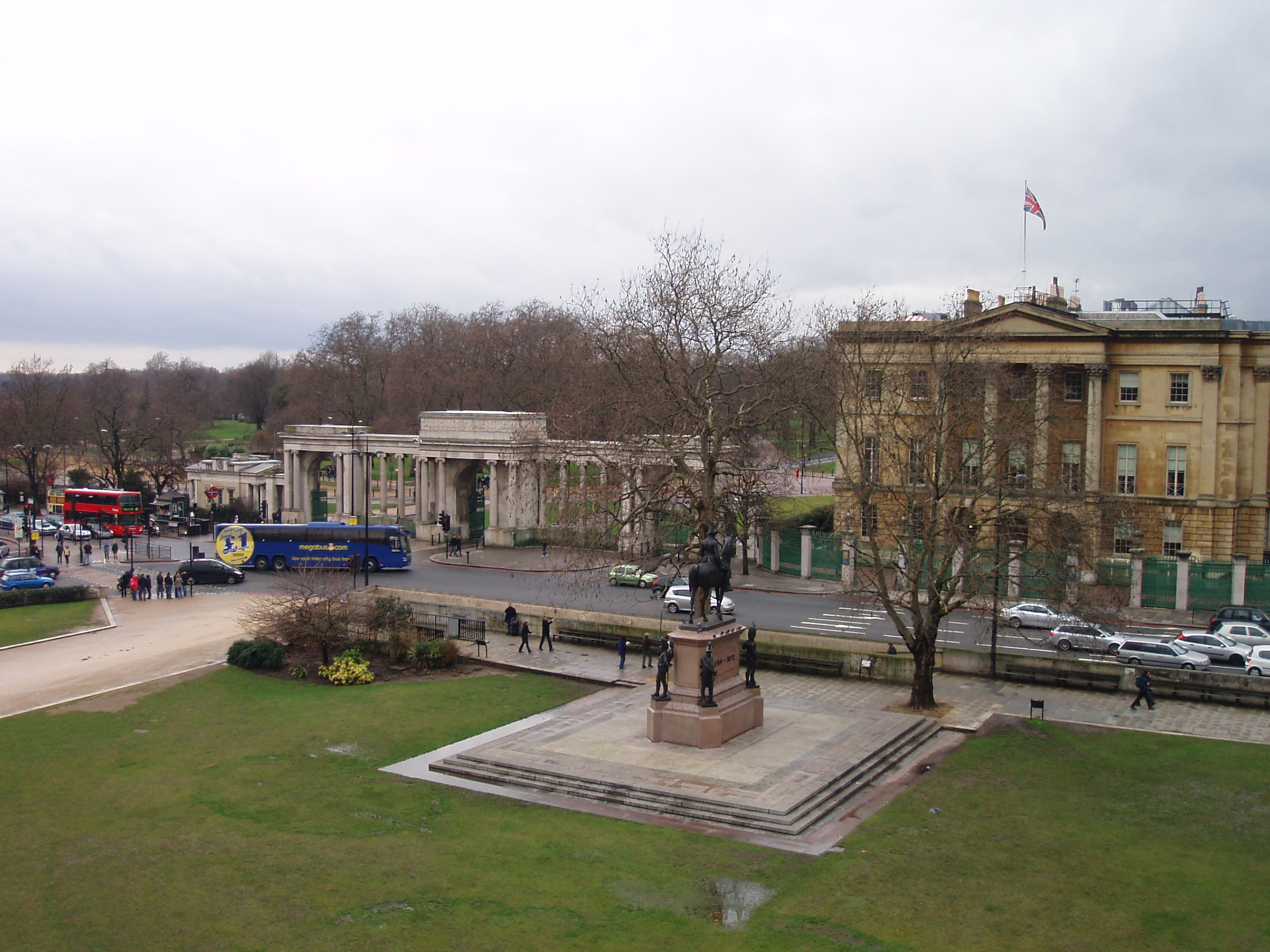
The statue of the Duke of Wellington facing Apsley House
