= Regency architecture =

19th-century British architectural style

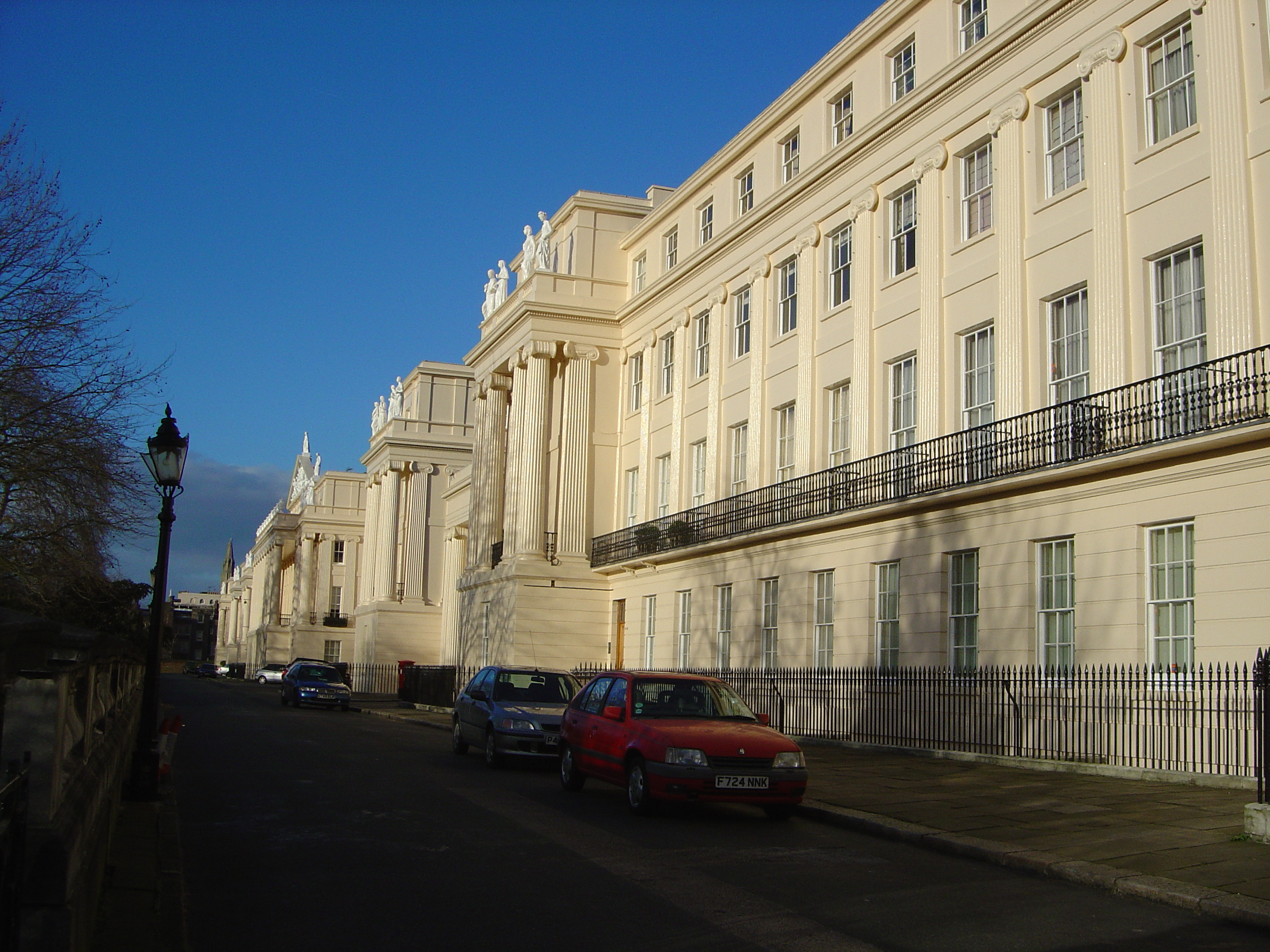
Cumberland Terrace, London, John Nash

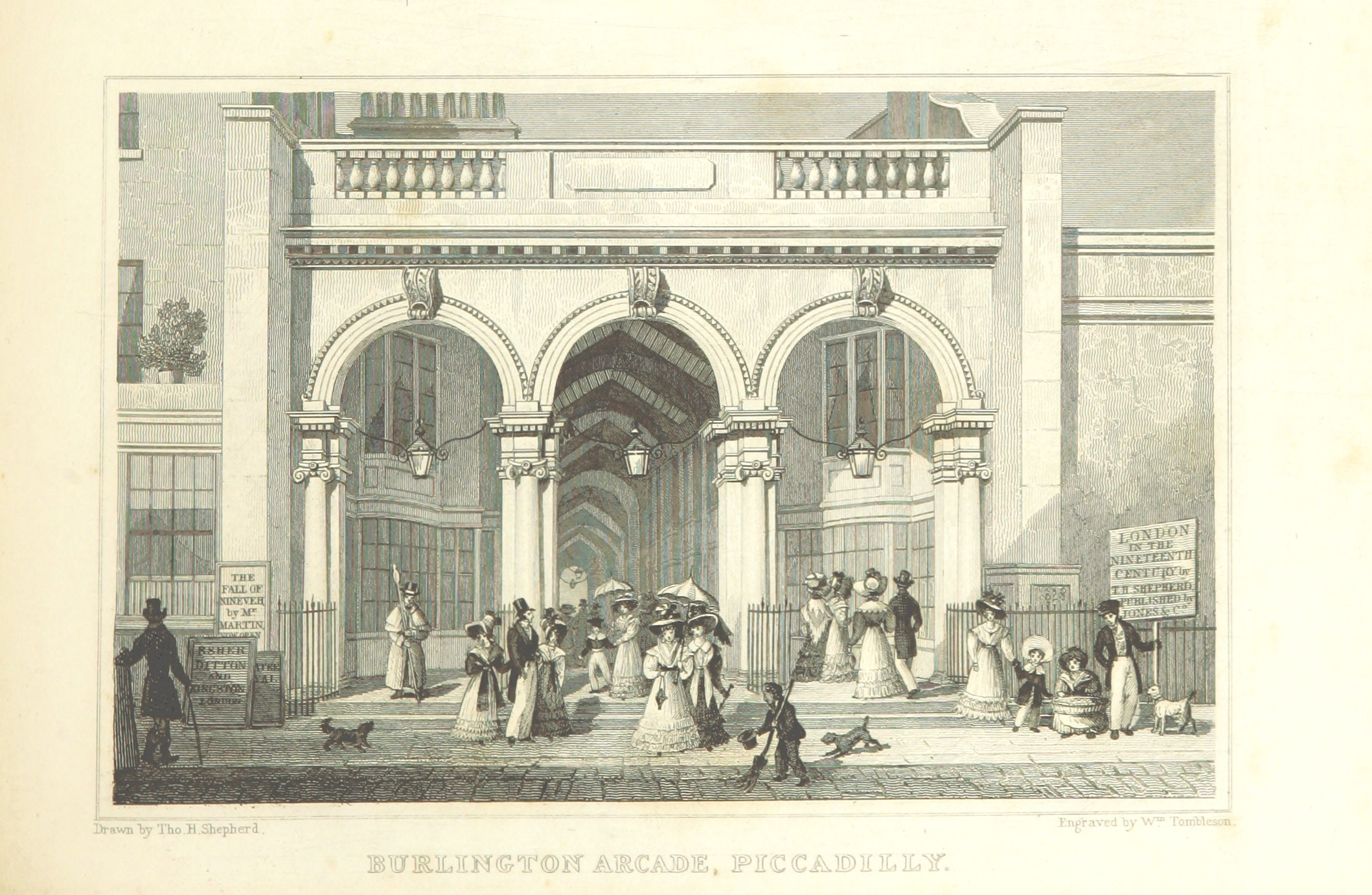
The original Piccadilly entrance to the Burlington Arcade, 1819

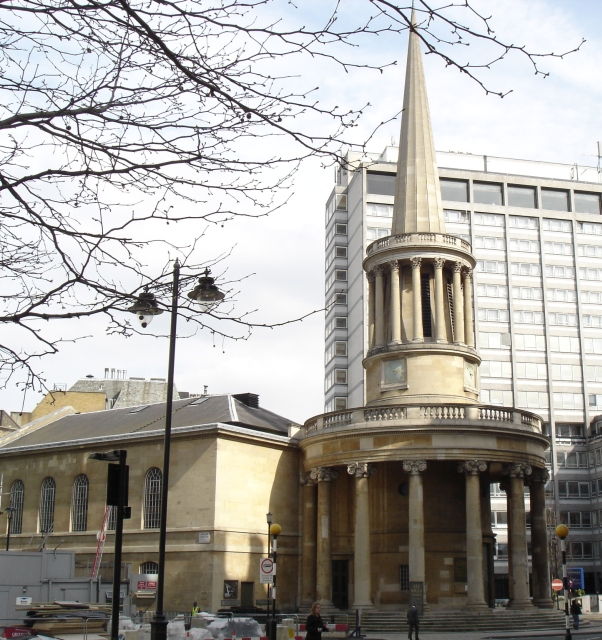
John Nash's All Souls Church, Langham Place, London

Regency architecture encompasses classical buildings built in the United Kingdom during the Regency era in the early 19th century when George IV was Prince Regent, and also to earlier and later buildings following the same style. The period coincides with the Biedermeier style in the German-speaking lands, Federal style in the United States and the French Empire style. Regency style is also applied to interior design and decorative arts of the period, typified by elegant furniture and vertically striped wallpaper, and to styles of clothing; for men, as typified by the dandy Beau Brummell and for women the Empire silhouette.

The style is strictly the late phase of Georgian architecture, and follows closely on from the neoclassical style of the preceding years, which continued to be produced throughout the period. The Georgian period takes its name from the four Kings George of the period 1714–1830, including King George IV. The British Regency strictly lasted only from 1811 to 1820, but the term is applied to architecture more widely, both before 1811 and after 1820; the next reign, of William IV from 1830 to 1837, has not been given its own stylistic descriptor. Regency architecture is especially distinctive in its houses, and also marked by an increase in the use of a range of eclectic Revival styles, from Gothic through Greek to Indian, as alternatives to the main neoclassical stream.

The opening years of the style were marked by greatly reduced levels of building because of the Napoleonic Wars, which saw government spending on building eliminated, shortages of imported timber, and high taxes on other building materials. In 1810 there was a serious financial crisis, though the only major asset class not to lose value was houses, at least in London, mainly because the low level of recent building had created pent-up demand. After the decisive victory at the Battle of Waterloo in 1815 ended the wars for good, there was a long financial boom amid greatly increased British self-confidence. Most Regency architecture comes from this period.

== Houses ==
Many buildings of the Regency style have a white painted stucco façade and an entryway to the main front door (usually coloured black) which is framed by two columns. In town centres the dominance of the terraced house continued, and crescents were especially popular. Elegant wrought iron balconies and bow windows came into fashion as part of this style. Further out of town the suburban "villa" detached house was popular in a range of sizes. Whereas most earlier Georgian housing for the middle classes had little ornament, the Regency period brought modest architectural pretensions to a much wider range of buildings, in a relaxed and confident application of the classical tradition as filtered through Palladianism.

For large country houses a range of picturesque styles were available, and the Gothic Revival was gathering strength, with many architects able to turn to different styles as their patron required. Ashridge (to 1817), Belvoir Castle and Fonthill Abbey (to 1813, now demolished), were all by James Wyatt, whose late career specialized in extravagant Gothic houses. Sezincote House (1805), designed by Samuel Pepys Cockerell, is a Neo-Mughal country house for a "nabob" returned from British India. Brighton Pavilion (to 1822) by John Nash, the seaside home of the Prince Regent, is Indian on the exterior, but the interiors include attempts at a Chinese style by Frederick Crace.

== Churches ==
Until the Church Building Act 1818, church building had been at a very low ebb for over 50 years. The Act allocated some public money for new churches required to reflect changes in population, and a commission to allocate it. Building of Commissioners' churches gathered pace in the 1820s, and continued until the 1850s. The early churches, falling into the Regency period, show a high proportion of Gothic Revival buildings, along with the classically inspired. Strict Greek Revival buildings were mixed with those continuing the modified Baroque and Roman Neoclassical traditions.

== Public buildings ==
The period saw a great increase in public buildings, at both the national and local level. In London, three bridges were built over the Thames between 1813 and 1819: Vauxhall Bridge, Waterloo Bridge and Southwark Bridge, all privately financed by toll charges. Shops began to be included systematically into newly planned developments, and the covered arcade of shops was introduced, with the Burlington Arcade in London (1815–19) the earliest.

== Leading architects ==
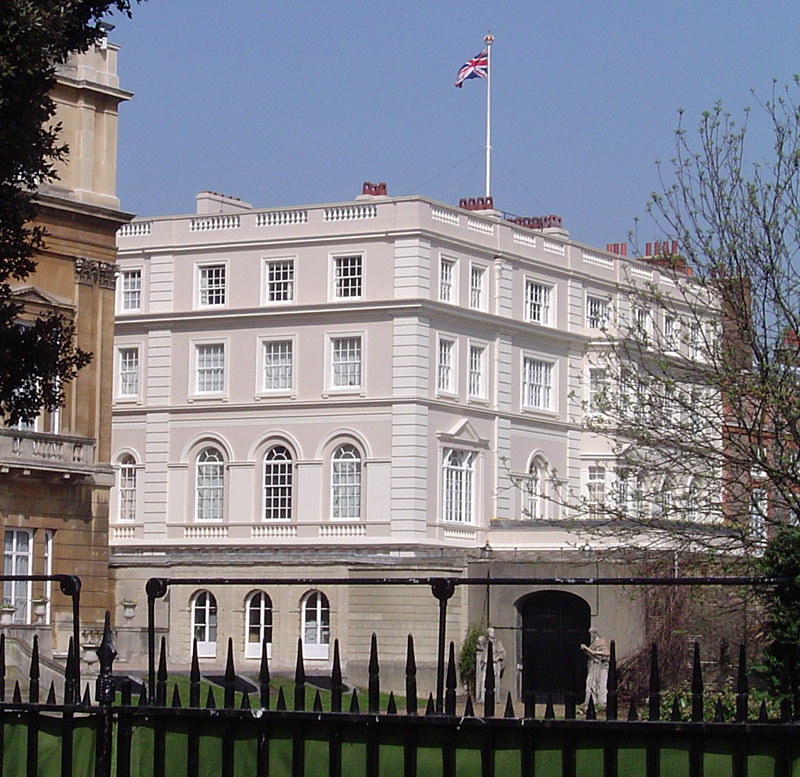
John Nash's Clarence House.

John Nash was the architect most associated with the Regency style; he was fully in tune with the commercial requirements of developers and designed the Regency terraces of Regent's Park and Regent Street in London. He had many pupils who disseminated his style, or in the case of Pugin rebelled against it. In London itself there are many streets in the style in the areas around Victoria, Pimlico, Mayfair and other central districts. John Soane was more individualistic, one of a number of European experimenters in Neoclassicism, but details from his inventive buildings were often picked up by other architects.

The public buildings of George Dance the Younger, City Architect of London from 1768, were precursors of the Regency style, though he designed little himself after 1798. Robert Smirke could produce both classical (British Museum) and Gothic designs, and also mainly worked on public buildings. With Nash and Soane he was one of the Board of Works' architects during the peak Regency period. A large commission of the period was the expansion of Windsor Castle for the king, which eventually cost over a million pounds, over three times the original budget. Smirke, Nash, Soane and Jeffry Wyatville were invited to tender, Wyatville winning the competition. He was a prolific designer, mostly for country houses, new-built or refurbished, able to work in a variety of styles. His uncle James Wyatt was a leading architect of the previous generation, and James' sons Benjamin Dean Wyatt and Philip Wyatt were also successful architects in the period.

== Locations ==
Apart from London, a number of English towns hold especial concentrations of Regency architecture. Several of the least-spoiled of these are new resort towns, attempting to emulate the success of Bath, Somerset and Buxton, spas which had been extensively developed in the mid-century Georgian period and the 1780s respectively. Brighton and other coastal resorts had become fashionable, and other towns that greatly expanded were Royal Leamington Spa in Warwickshire, the Clifton suburb of Bristol, Tunbridge Wells, Newcastle upon Tyne, and Cheltenham, "perhaps the most complete surviving Regency town".

Excellent examples of Regency properties dominate Brighton and Hove in East Sussex; in particular in its Kemp Town and Brunswick (Hove) estates.

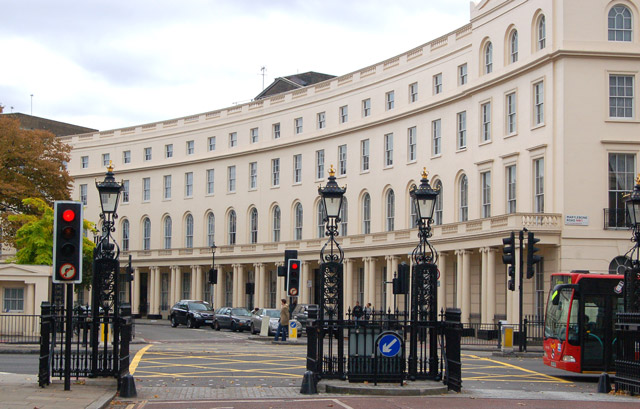
Park Crescent, London

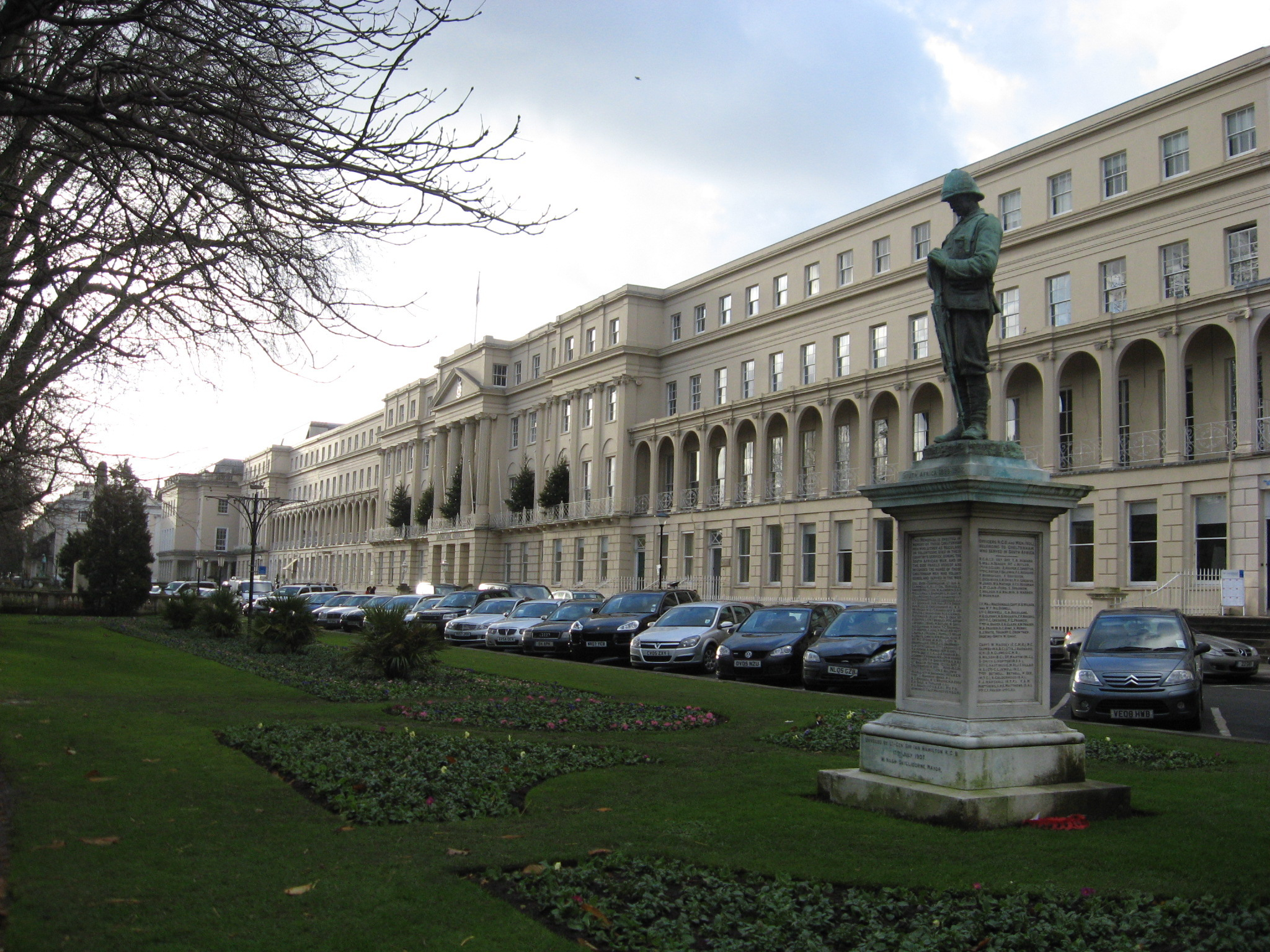
Regency houses, now municipal buildings in Cheltenham

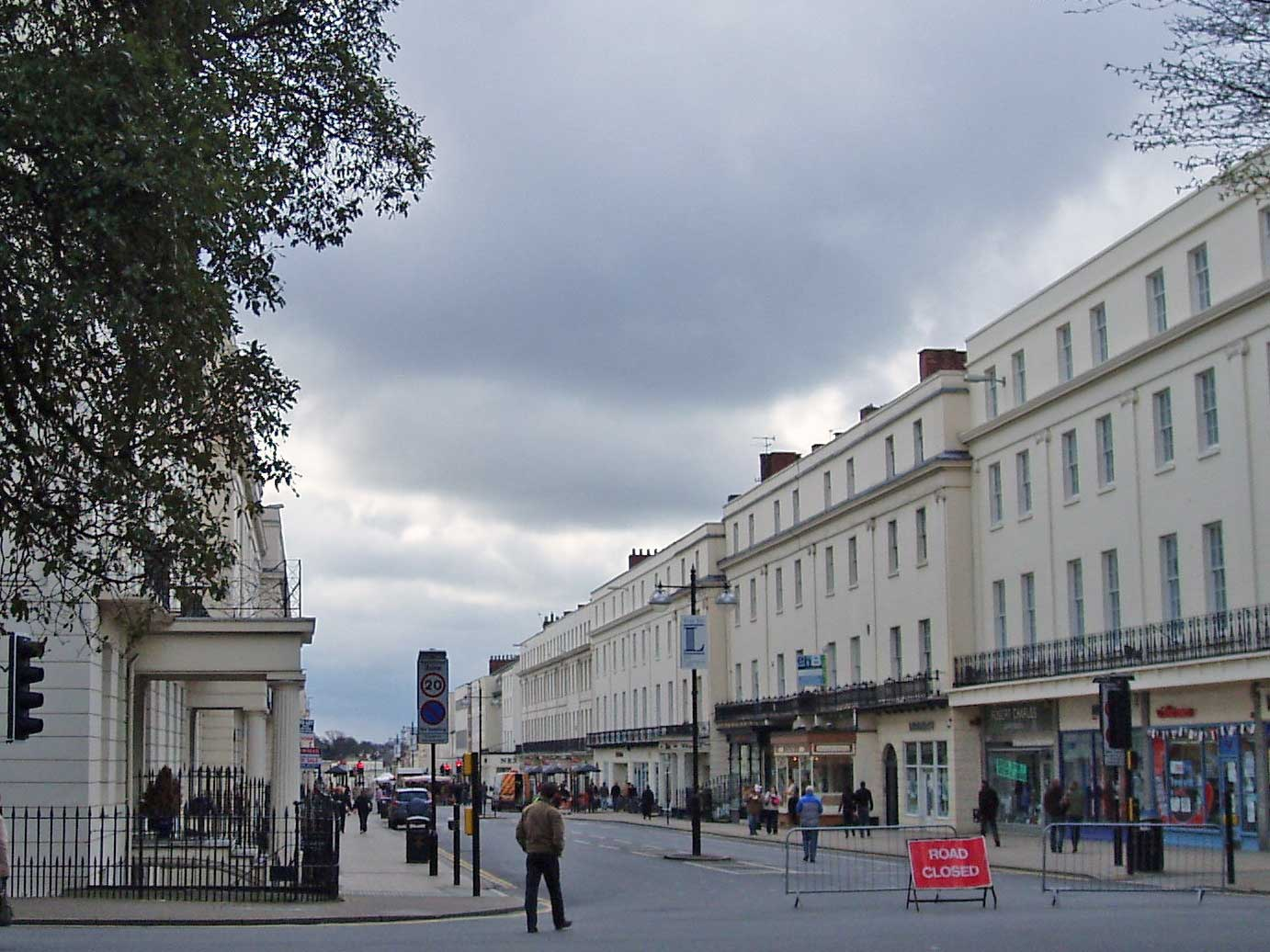
The Parade, Leamington Spa

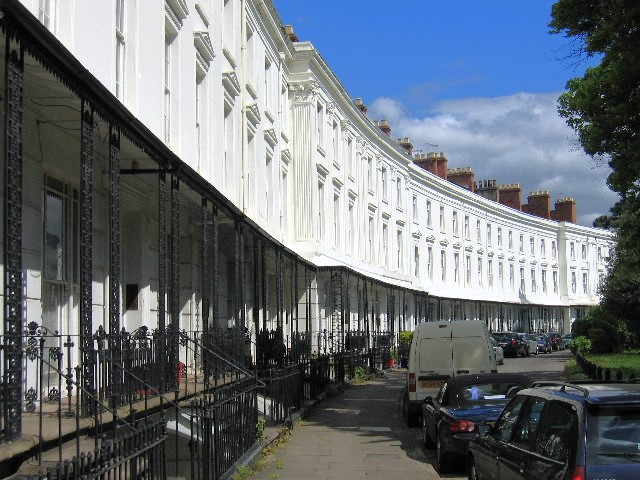
Lansdowne Crescent, Leamington Spa

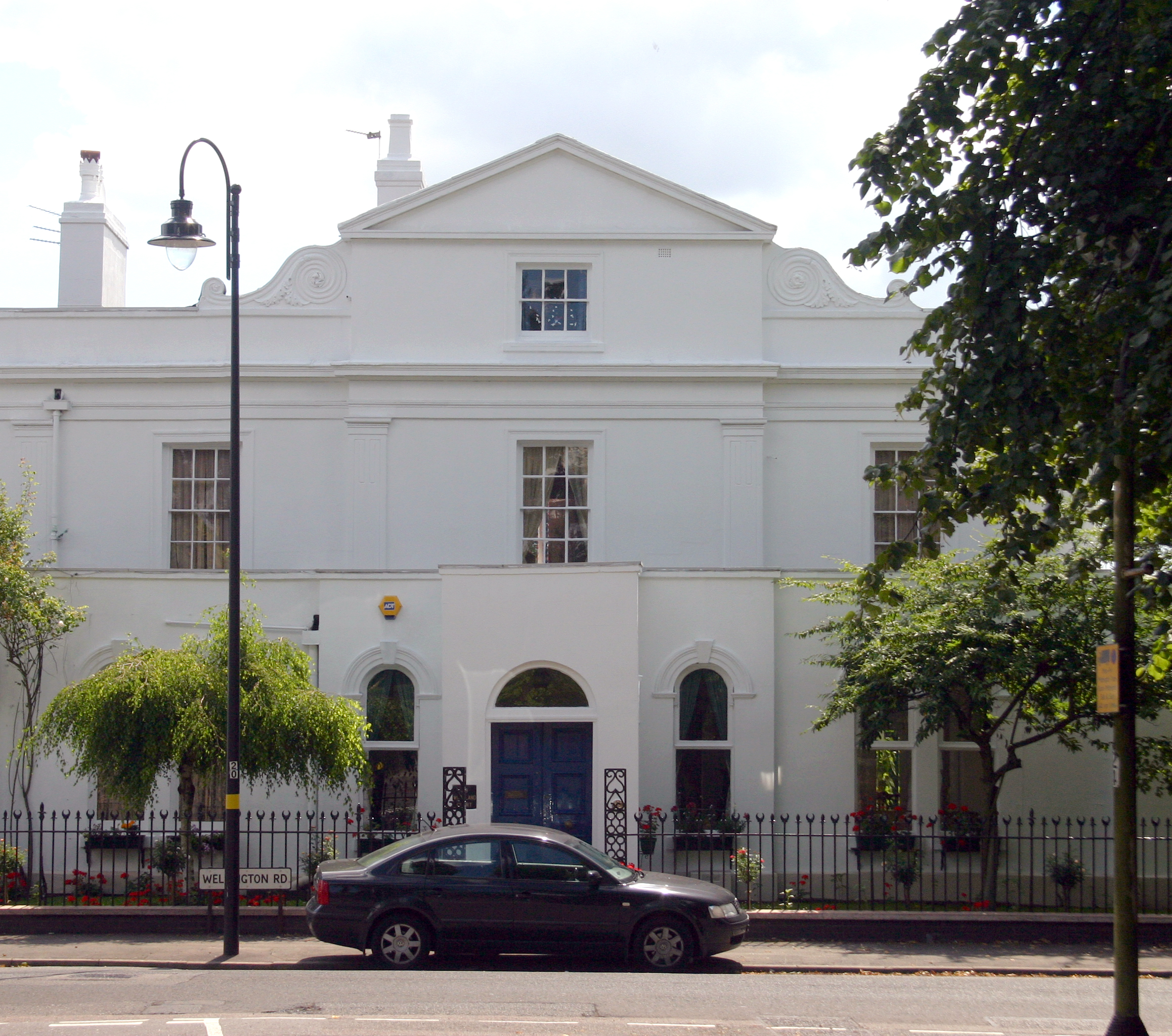
Suburban "villa" in Edgbaston, a suburb of Birmingham, 1820s

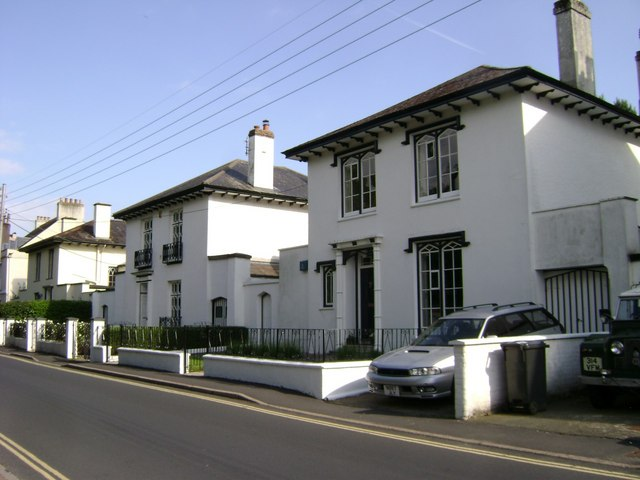
Smaller semi-detached villas with Gothic details, Dawlish

== See also ==
- Buildings and architecture of Brighton and Hove
- Hollywood Regency
