= Lancaster House =

Mansion in St James's, London

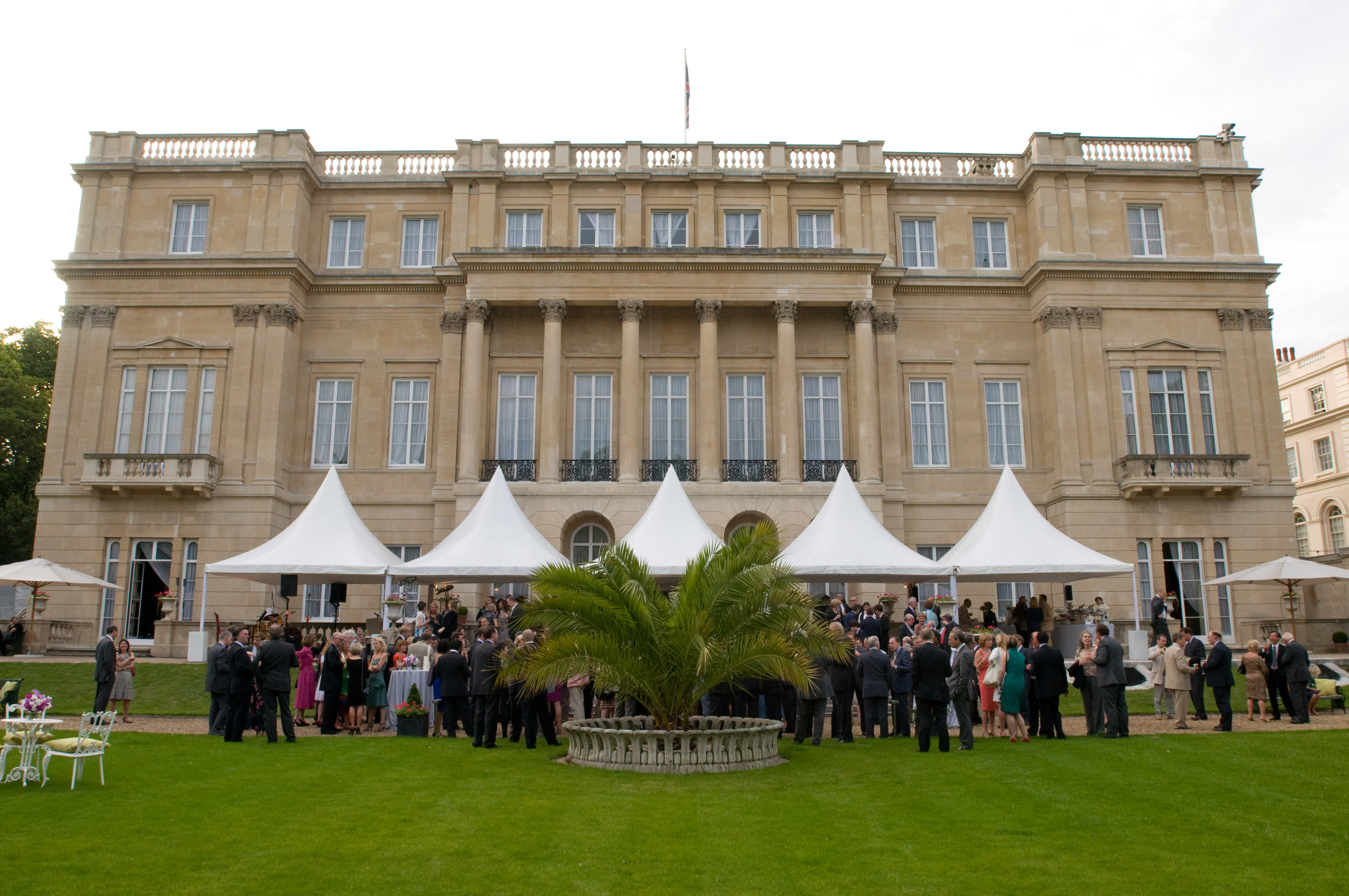
- Interactive map of the Lancaster House area

General information
- Architectural style: Neo-classical
- Location: St James's; London, SW1; United Kingdom
- Coordinates: 51°30′14″N 0°8′21″W
- Current tenants: Foreign, Commonwealth and Development Office
- Construction started: 1825
- Completed: 1840; 186 years ago
- Owner: HM Government

Technical details
- Floor count: Three (plus basement)

Design and construction
- Architects: Benjamin Dean Wyatt (interior and exterior); Sir Charles Barry (interior); Sir Robert Smirke (interior)

Listed Building – Grade I
- Official name: Lancaster House
- Designated: 5 February 1970
- Reference no.: 1236546

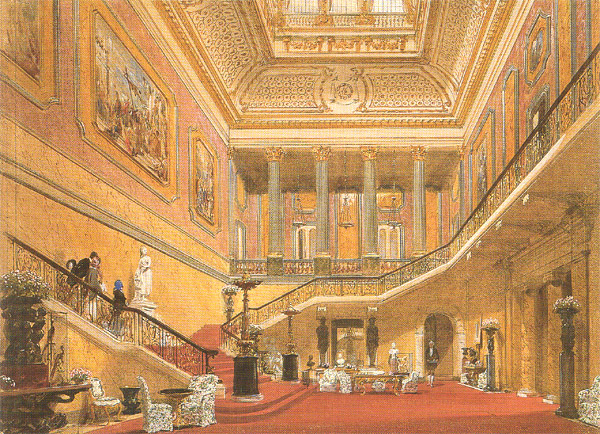
The central hall and principal staircase of Lancaster House by Joseph Nash, 1850

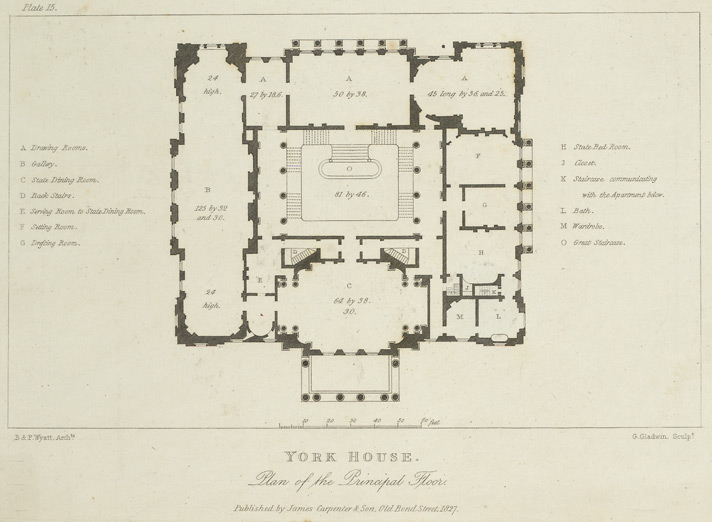
A plan of the principal floor in 1827. Only minor alterations have been made to the layout of this storey since then.

Lancaster House (originally known as York House and then Stafford House) is a mansion on The Mall in the St James's district in the City of Westminster. Adjacent to Green Park, it is next to Clarence House and St James's Palace, as much of the site was once part of the palace grounds.

Initially planned for Prince Frederick, Duke of York and Albany, it was ultimately completed by George Leveson-Gower, 1st Duke of Sutherland, then Marquess of Stafford, as an aristocratic townhouse in the early 19th century, and known for its lavish interiors. Gifted to the government in the early 20th century, it houses the government's wine cellars and was home to the London Museum until the Second World War. Now used for diplomatic receptions and related functions by the Foreign Office, it is a historic Grade I listed building, and its interiors are sometimes used in films or television as a stand-in for Buckingham Palace.

== History ==
=== York House ===
Prince Frederick, Duke of York and Albany purchased the lease of the site in 1807, upon which then stood Godolphin House. A new lease over the site was granted for a 99-year period on 10 October 1825, and construction was commenced on a new building in the place of Godolphin House; the new building was to be known as York House. Sir Robert Smirke was originally hired to design the house, until under the influence of the Duke's mistress Elizabeth Manners, Duchess of Rutland, he was replaced by Benjamin Dean Wyatt, who mainly designed the exterior.

Following the Duke's death in 1827 the lease over the site and the as yet-unfinished York House were purchased by the British government for £81,913.

=== Stafford House ===
The lease of the house was subsequently purchased by the 2nd Marquess of Stafford (later 1st Duke of Sutherland) and was under his direction that it was completed during the period of 1833 to 1838. As a result of the significant expenditure incurred by the Duke to complete the house and add an additional story, the lease was surrendered and the Duke secured a new 99-year lease on 5 July 1841 at a cost of £72,000. The building was thereafter known as Stafford House for the remainder of the 19th century.

The completed building was three floors in height, the state rooms being on the first floor or piano nobile, family living rooms on the ground floor and family bedrooms on the second floor. There was also a basement containing service rooms and wine cellar. The interior, featured an imperial staircase which was designed by Sir Charles Barry, as well Louis XIV style rooms which were lavishly decorated.

The Sutherlands’ liberal politics and love of the arts attracted many distinguished guests, including the factory reformer the Earl of Shaftesbury, the anti-slavery author Harriet Beecher Stowe and the Italian revolutionary leader Giuseppe Garibaldi. Chopin gave a recital there in 1848 in the presence of Queen Victoria.

Queen Victoria is said to have remarked to Harriet Sutherland-Leveson-Gower, Duchess of Sutherland on arriving at Stafford House, "I have come from my House to your Palace." With its ornate decoration and the dramatic sweep of the great staircase, the Grand Hall is a magnificent introduction to one of the finest town houses in London. In 1877 the House became the eponymous home of the Stafford House Committee for the Relief of Sick and Wounded Turkish Soldiers, formed by the 3rd Duke to aid Ottoman refugees and wounded during the Russo-Turkish War.

The house went out of royal favour after Anne Sutherland-Leveson-Gower, Duchess of Sutherland died, in 1888 and her husband married his mistress within months.

=== Lancaster House ===
In 1912 Cromartie Sutherland-Leveson-Gower, 4th Duke of Sutherland sold the lease of Stafford House to the Lancastrian industrialist and philanthropist Sir William Lever, 1st Baronet (later 1st Viscount Leverhulme), who renamed the building Lancaster House in honour of his native county of Lancashire and presented it to the nation in the following year.

Since 1922 the building has housed the Government Wine Cellar, and, from 1924 until shortly after World War II, the house was the home of the London Museum.

The Allied Governments' European Advisory Commission on the political and social future of Europe after the Second World War met here throughout 1944 and into 1945. In January 1947 a special envoy meeting on affairs concerning occupied Austria was hosted here. In 1956 the signing of the agreement of independence for Malaya occurred in the house. In 1961 South Africa affirmed its intention to become a republic, inside the Commonwealth. In 1979 it was the scene of the Lancaster House Agreement, which led to the independence of Rhodesia, now Zimbabwe, from the United Kingdom.

The house was the venue for the 10th G7 summit in 1984 and the 17th G7 summit in 1991. A new 35-foot-long table was built for the Long Gallery, where the main negotiating sessions were planned in 1991.

Prime Minister Theresa May gave a speech at Lancaster House in January 2017 outlining Britain's intended future relationship with the European Union following the 2016 United Kingdom European Union membership referendum which resulted in a vote to leave. The speech is commonly referred to in the media, and in political discourse, as the "Lancaster House speech".

In June 2025 delegations from China and the United States convened at Lancaster House to address issues related to the ongoing trade war between the two nations. The Chinese delegation was led by Vice Premier He Lifeng, accompanied by Minister of Commerce Wang Wentao and Trade Representative Li Chenggang. Meanwhile, the American delegation was headed by Secretary of Commerce Howard Lutnick, who was joined by Treasury Secretary Scott Bessent and Trade Representative Jamieson Greer.

== In popular culture ==
Winston Churchill commented that towards the end of the 19th century, "glittering parties at Lansdowne House, Devonshire House or Stafford House (Lancaster House) comprised all the elements which made a gay and splendid social circle in close relation to the business of Parliament, the hierarchies of the Army and Navy, and the policy of the State."

Lancaster House has been used extensively as a filming location. It has stood in for Buckingham Palace at least six times in film and television: for the comedy film King Ralph (1991), the mystery adventure film National Treasure: Book of Secrets (2007), the historical drama film The Young Victoria (2009), the historical drama film The King's Speech (2010), and the 2013 Christmas special for Downton Abbey, when Rose is presented to the King and Queen during the London Season. Lancaster House reprised its role as Buckingham Palace for the Netflix series The Crown and as the site of a masquerade ball in the Merchant-Ivory film The Golden Bowl (2000).

== See also ==
- The Lancaster House Conferences
- The Lancaster House Treaties
- The Lancaster House Agreement
- The Government Wine Cellar

== Bibliography ==
- Yorke, James (2001). Lancaster House: London's Greatest Town House. Merrell Publishers Ltd. ISBN 9780385601153.
