= Wyatt Family =

Wyatt Family may refer to:

- Wyatt family, a family of 18th and 19th century English architects
- The Wyatt Family, a professional wrestling stable in WWE
