= Lancaster Accords =

Lancaster Accords may refer to:

- Lancaster House Agreement, a 1979 ceasefire ending the Rhodesian Bush War
- Lancaster House Treaties, a 2010 Anglo-French military co-operation agreement

== See also ==
- Lancaster House Conferences (disambiguation)
