= Bashaw (statue) =

Sculpture by Matthew Cotes Wyatt

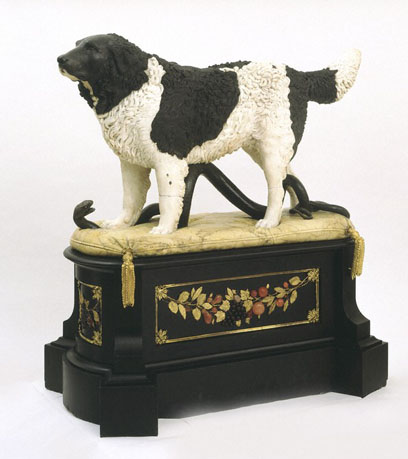
- Artist: Matthew Cotes Wyatt
- Year: c. 1832–34
- Medium: Coloured marbles and hardstones
- Location: Victoria and Albert Museum, London
- Accession: A.4:1 to 6-1960

Bashaw, a Newfoundland dog, sat some fifty times for his portrait. His owner, John Ward, 4th Viscount Dudley and Ward, commissioned the marble sculpture from Matthew Cotes Wyatt in 1831. The work was to have been displayed in Dudley House in London, but Lord Dudley died in 1833 before it was finished, and Bashaw remained in the possession of the sculptor until his death in 1862. Dogs' portraits were occasionally painted during the nineteenth century, but this elaborate lifesize sculpted piece, originally set with gems, is unique. In 1851 it was shown at the Great Exhibition, where it was entitled The Faithful Friend to Man Trampling Underfoot his Most Insidious Enemy, in reference to the bronze cobra beneath the dog's feet. The placid expression of the dog, and the elegant cushion on which he stands, contrast with the coiled energy of the snake.

The sculpture remained unsold at the sale of Wyatt's effects after his death in 1862, and fell into the possession of his son, James, who put it up for sale at Christie's in 1887. It was unsold, but subsequently passed into the possession of John Corbett of Impney Hall, Droitwitch, Worcestershire, and was then sold to Edward Stevens of Prescott House, Stourbridge, in 1906. In 1957 the sculpture was sold again; it was bought by the Victoria and Albert Museum for £200 in 1960.

Matthew Cotes Wyatt was the son of the architect James Wyatt, and was a painter and designer as well as a sculptor. The elaborate base made for Bashaw reflects his abilities in the field of decorative arts. In 1834 Wyatt held an exhibition of his works with Bashaw as the centrepiece. It was described in the catalogue as "the most elaborate [portrayal] of a quadruped ever produced by ancient or modern art".

The sculpture is made of coloured marbles and hardstones. The dog's eyes are topaz, sardonyx and black lava, while the snake is bronze with ruby eyes. The cushions are of gilt bronze.

== Bibliography ==
- Jackson, Anna, ed. (2001). V&A: A Hundred Highlights. V&A Publications. ISBN 1-85177-365-7
