= Equestrian statue of the Duke of Wellington, Aldershot =

Statue by Matthew Cotes Wyatt

Equestrian statue of the Duke of Wellington
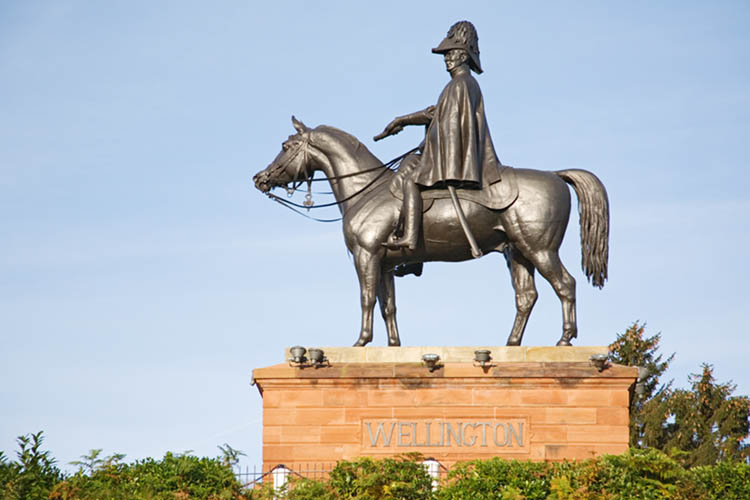
- The Wellington Monument, Aldershot, showing the Duke of Wellington, holding a field marshal's baton, seated on his charger Copenhagen
- Artist: Matthew Cotes Wyatt
- Subject: Arthur Wellesley, 1st Duke of Wellington
- Dimensions: 910 cm × 790 cm (30 ft × 26 ft); 22 feet 8 inches ft diameter
- Weight: 40 tonnes
- Location: Aldershot; 51.2534°N 0.7799°W

The Wellington statue in Aldershot, England is a monument to Arthur Wellesley, 1st Duke of Wellington, victor at the Battle of Waterloo and later prime minister of the United Kingdom. Sculpted by Matthew Cotes Wyatt, it was the largest equestrian statue in Britain when it was unveiled at its original location on the Wellington Arch at Hyde Park Corner in 1846.

== Origins ==
In 1837 a committee was formed under the chairmanship of the Duke of Rutland to raise sufficient funds for a memorial to the Duke of Wellington. The sculptor was Matthew Cotes Wyatt. In the statue Wellington is shown on Copenhagen, the famous charger he had ridden at Waterloo. Much of the bronze in the statue is derived from French cannon captured at Waterloo and remelted in Wyatt's foundry. Wellington himself sat for the sculptor; Copenhagen, however, had died and a substitute horse was used as a model. This offended many at the time, who saw a poor likeness to Copenhagen in the statue.

The position selected for the sculpture was on top of the triumphal arch at Hyde Park Corner, built in 1827–28 in conjunction with an Ionic screen as part of a processional route between the park and Buckingham Palace. Wellington had his London residence at Apsley House, immediately next to the screen.

The work was executed at Wyatt's workshop at Dudley House in the Harrow Road, starting in May 1840. The modelling work was done by Wyatt's son James Wyatt. The model consisted of more than three tons of plaster of Paris formed over a timber frame with a beam for the backbone and transverse timbers like the ribs of a ship. The model was on a turntable 20 feet (6.1 m) in diameter and the artists could reach all parts of it by means of an adjustable stage that could be raised and lowered. The modelling work took three years.

For casting, the model was lowered into a pit in a specially built foundry. The statue was cast in bronze melted in two furnaces; one could melt twelve tons at a time, but this was found insufficient, so a second furnace of 20 tons capacity was constructed. Even so, the body of the horse and the lower limbs of the Duke were cast in two pieces and the rest of the statue was cast in a further six pieces, all between 1 and 3 inches (25 and 76 mm) thick. The legs of the horse were cast solid so as to bear the great weight.

At the time it was the largest equestrian statue in Britain, being 30 feet (9.1 m) high, 26 feet (7.9 m) from Copenhagen's nose to tail, and 22 feet 8 inches (6.91 m) in girth. It weighed 40 tons. In 1846 the statue was moved with great pageantry from Wyatt's workshop to Hyde Park Corner. It was transported on a huge, low carriage with wheels 10 feet (3.0 m) in diameter, constructed by H.M. Dockyards at Woolwich. The carriage was hauled by a hundred men of the Scots Fusilier Guards; as it emerged on to the road, it was greeted by enthusiastic cheers from the crowd of sightseers. Twenty-nine horses then drew the carriage to Hyde Park Corner. It took some hours to get the statue into position for hoisting and the final lift and fixing into position on the victory arch was completed the following day.

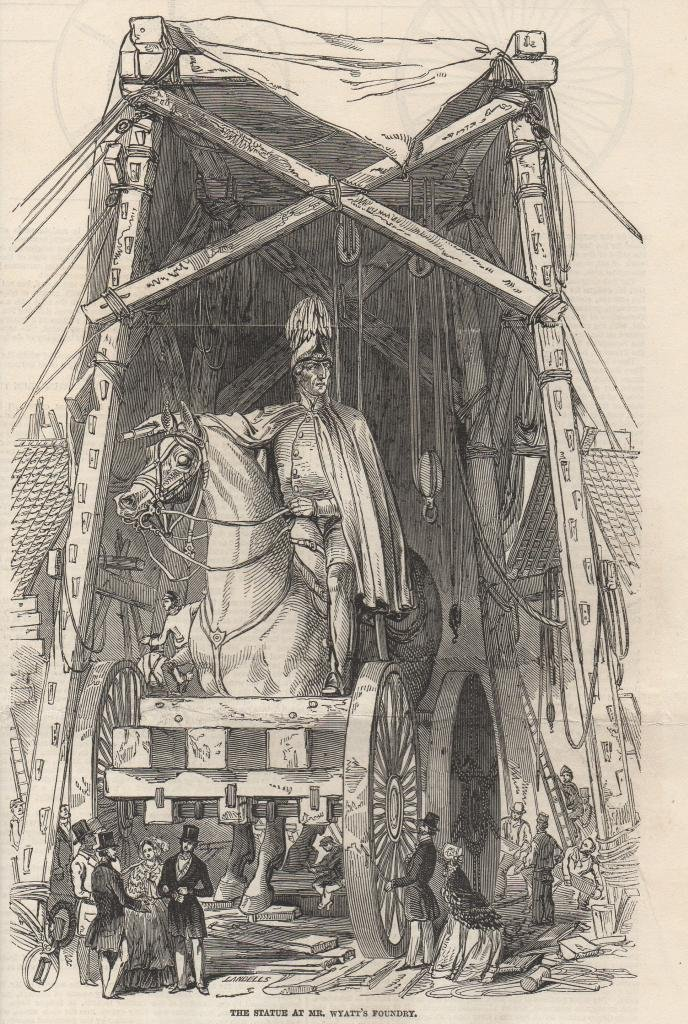
The statue leaves Wyatt's foundry in 1846

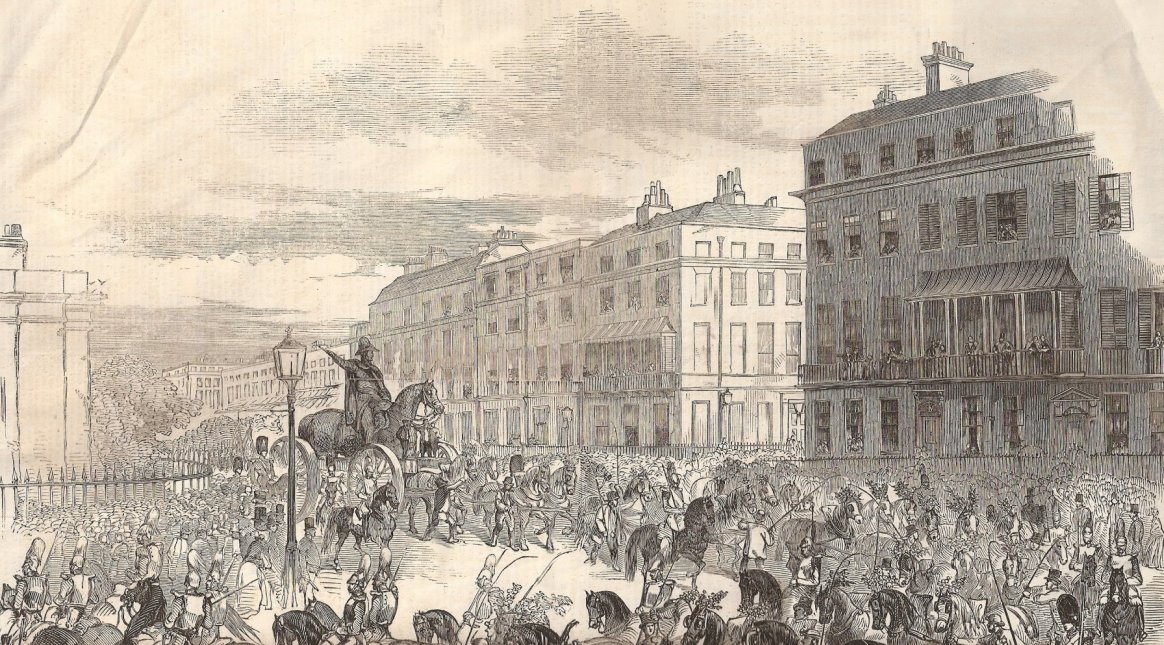
'The Grand Procession of the Wellington Statue, Turning Down Park Lane' The Illustrated London News 3 October 1846

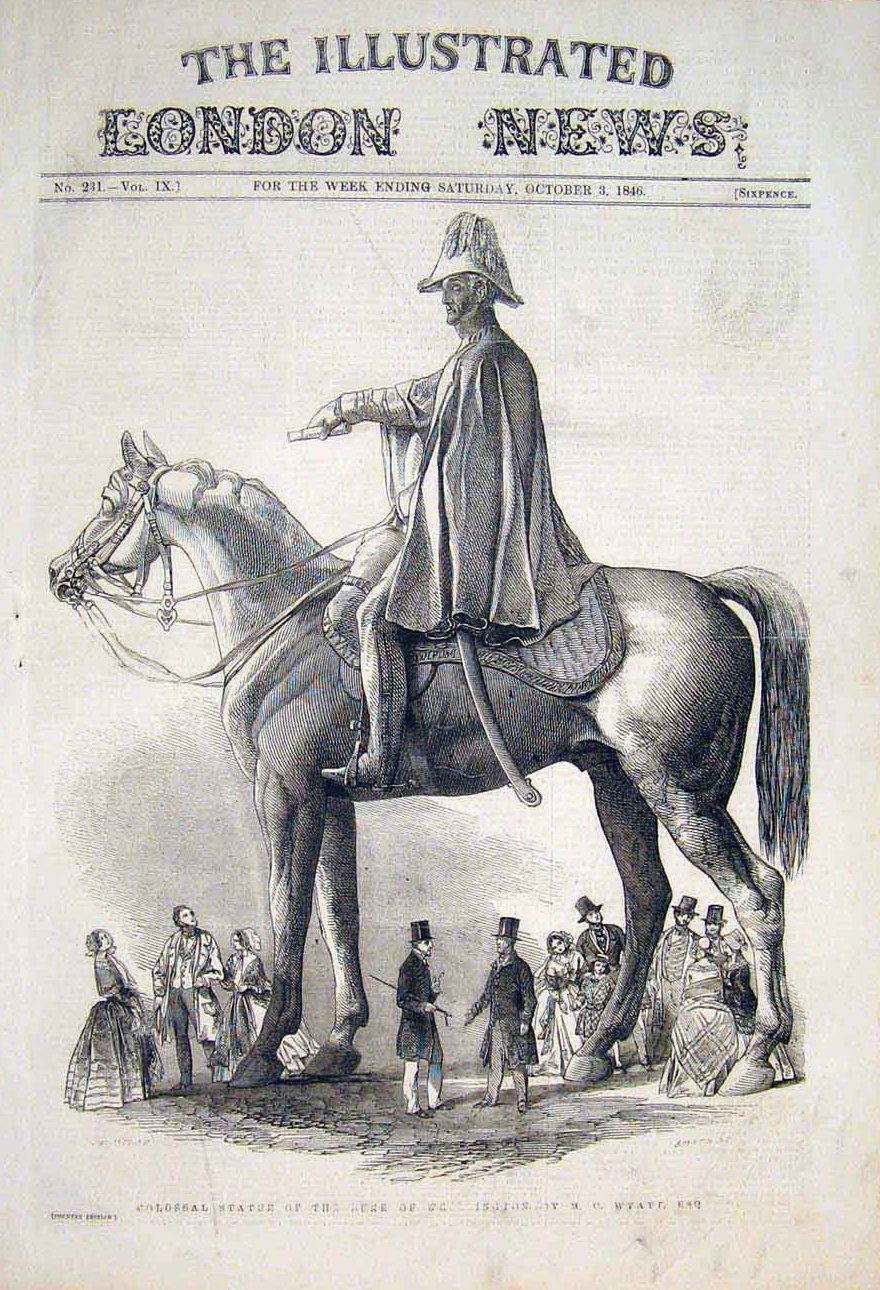
The completed statue in 1846 showing its dimensions

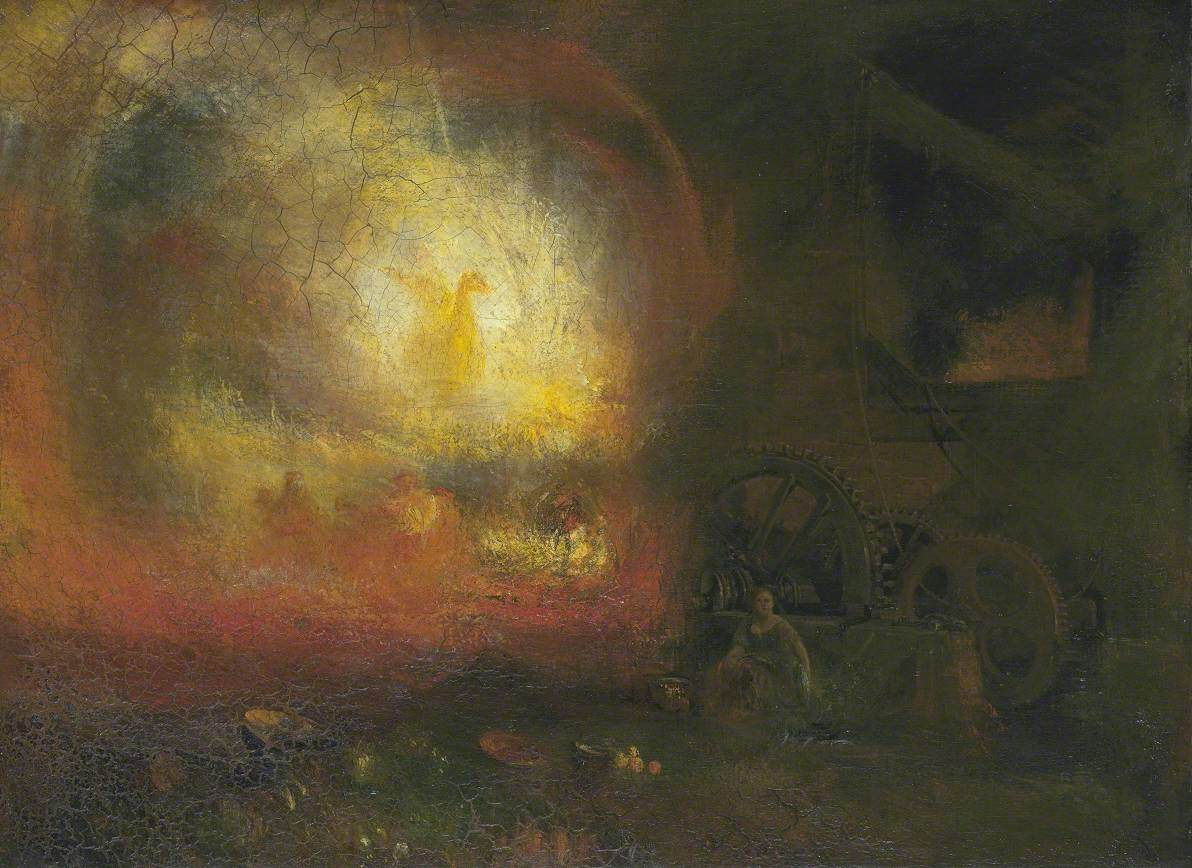
The Hero of a Hundred Fights by J.M.W. Turner, 1847

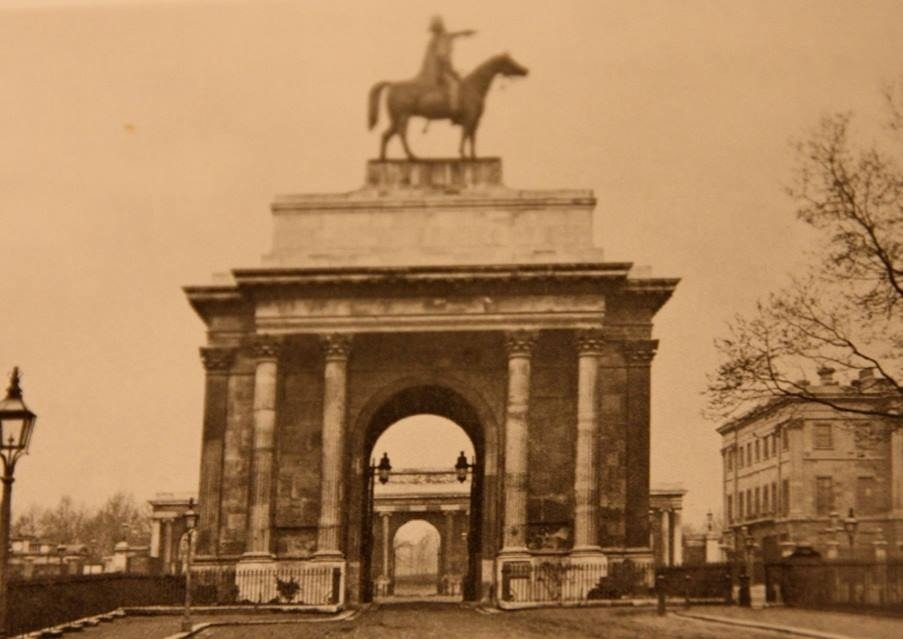
The statue on Wellington Arch, c. 1850s

== Move to Aldershot ==
Many thought the statue out of proportion to the arch: its architect, Decimus Burton, especially disliked it, and left money in his will for the statue's removal. Queen Victoria also regarded it as an eyesore, marring the view from Buckingham Palace; however, it could not be tactfully moved during the lifetime of the Duke of Wellington, who would have seen such a move as an insult.

In 1882–83 the arch was moved a short distance, to its present location on Hyde Park Corner; the statue of Wellington was removed and left in Green Park while its future location was debated. In 1883 the Prince of Wales, the future King Edward VII, suggested that it should be moved to Aldershot Military Town, "where it will be highly regarded by the Army". Eventually Parliament agreed with his suggestion and the statue was taken to Aldershot for reassembly. Its removal from the arch had been a relief to the many critics who had considered it out of proportion and inappropriate for such a location.

On a visit to Aldershot, the Prince of Wales selected Round Hill, close by the Royal Pavilion and Royal Garrison Church, as the new site for the statue. Moving Wyatt's creation from London was no mean feat. However, it was successfully and ceremoniously handed to the British Army in August 1885 in front of a large crowd of onlookers.

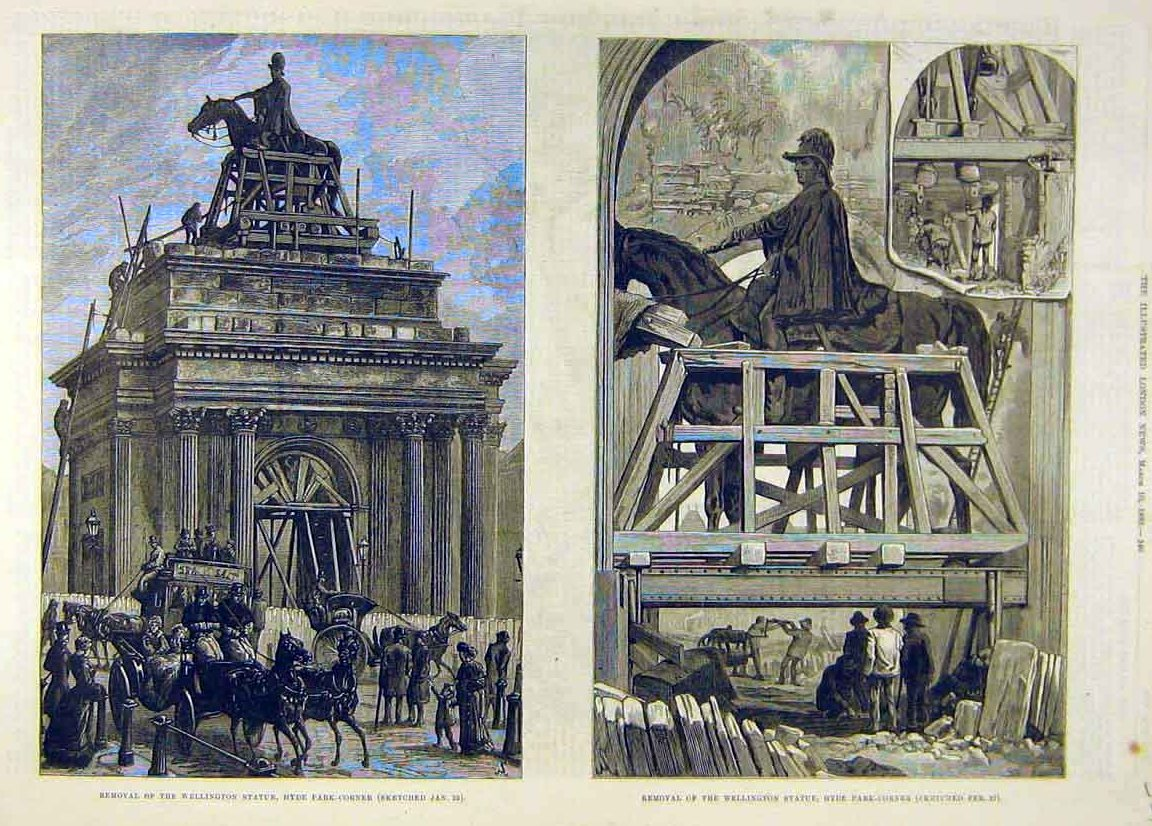
Lowering the statue in 1883

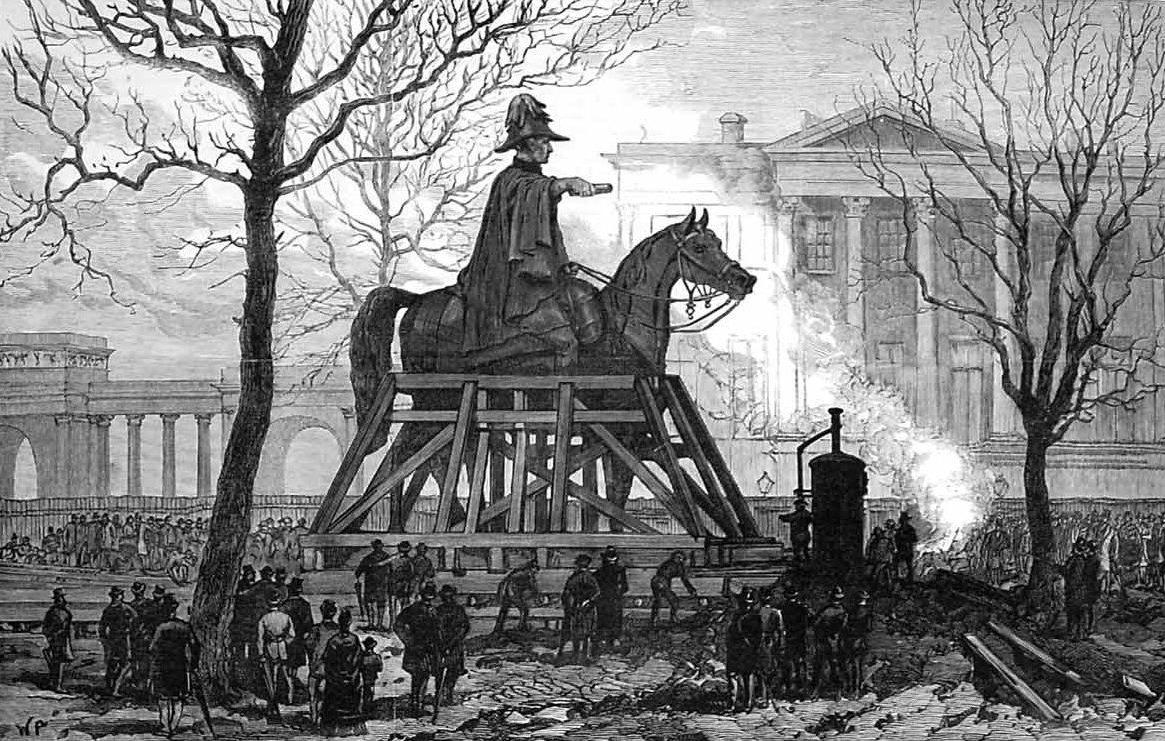
The statue being moved to storage in 1883

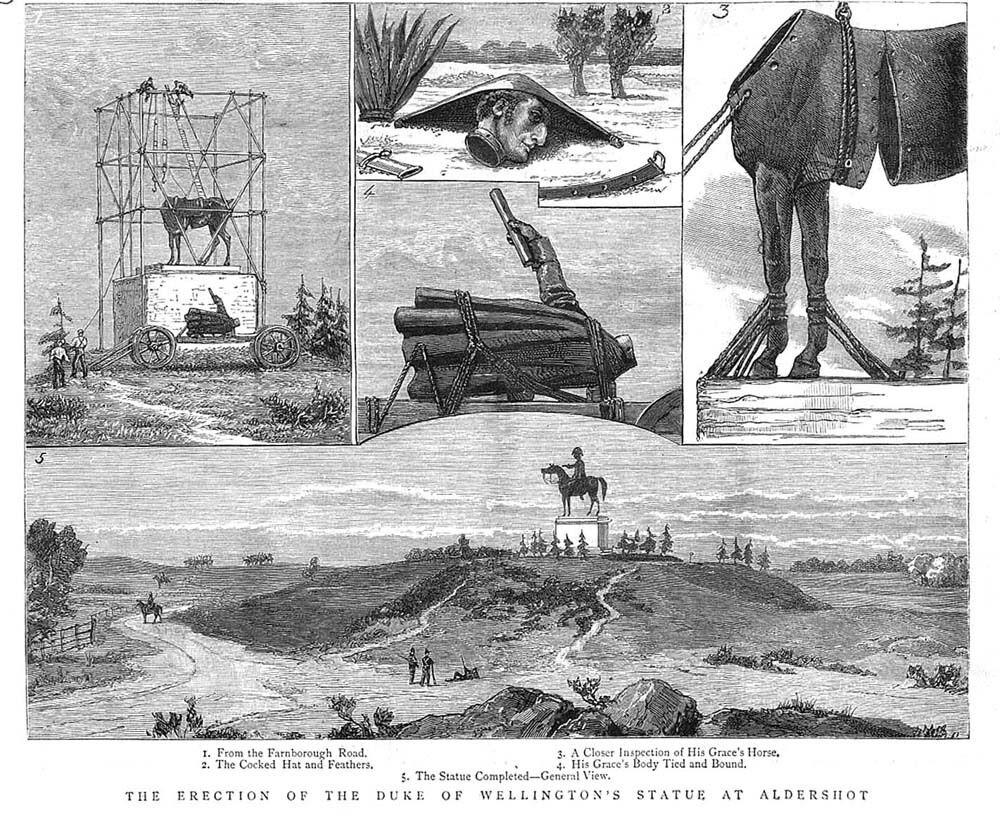
Re-erection at Aldershot in 1885

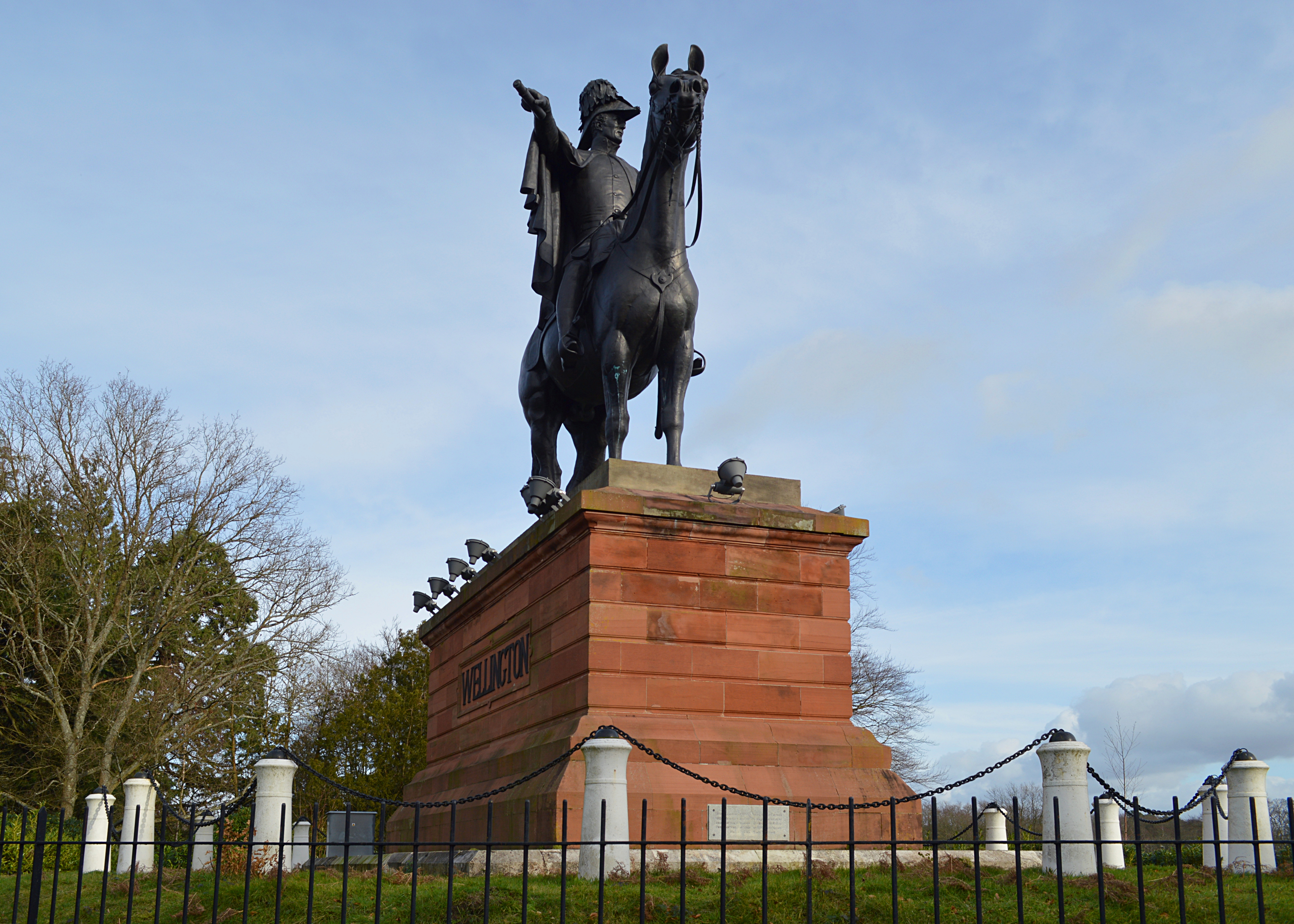
The statue at Aldershot, 2014

== Restoration ==
The statue fell into a poor condition in the latter half of the twentieth century, being largely hidden behind overgrown trees and bushes on Round Hill. In early 2004 Aldershot Garrison, supported by local conservation groups and volunteers, commenced a major restoration project to restore it to its original condition. The bushes were cleared and the statue was re-bronzed.

The Friends of the Aldershot Military Museum have taken on the role of "Friends of the Statue", supported by Aldershot Garrison, Rushmoor Council and the Blackwater Valley Countryside Partnership.

As of November 2022, a visit to the statue is rated by Tripadvisor as 19th-best thing to do in Aldershot.

== See also ==
- B. Hick & Sons
- Equestrian statue of the Duke of Wellington, Hyde Park Corner
