= Matthew Cotes Wyatt =

English painter and sculptor (1777–1862)

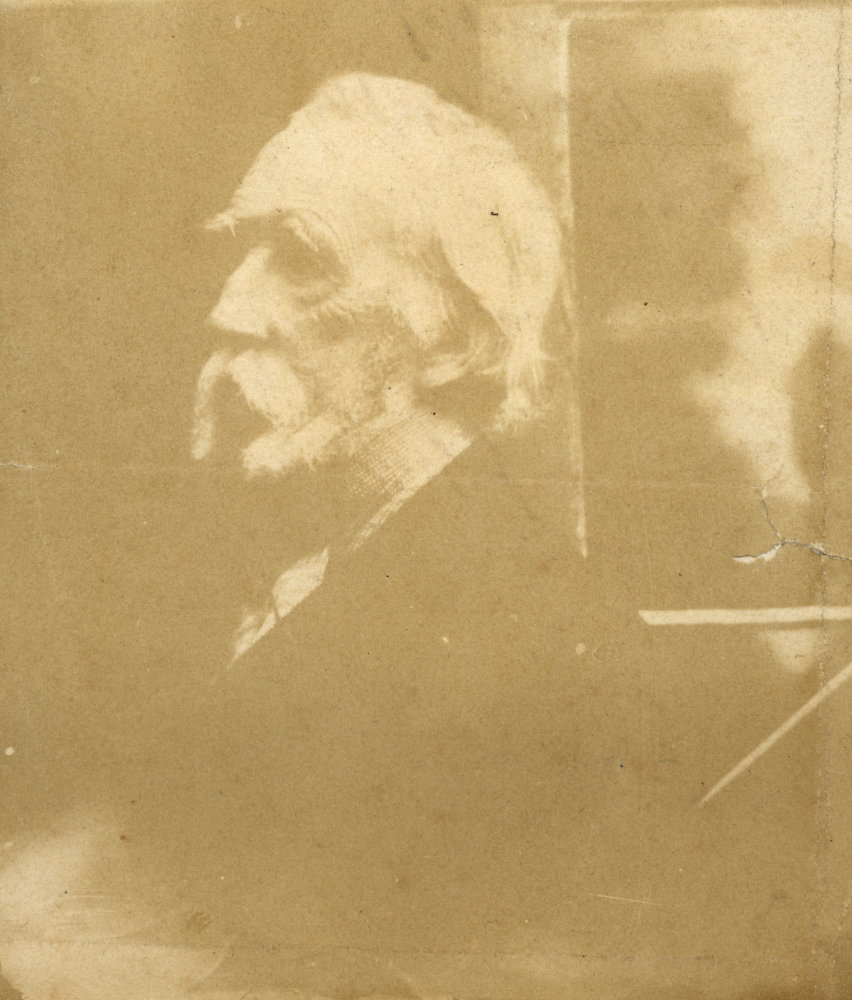
Matthew Cotes Wyatt in 1861, photographed by his son James Wyatt (1808-1893)

Matthew Cotes Wyatt (1777 – 3 January 1862) was an English painter and sculptor and a member of the Wyatt family, who were well known in the Victorian era as architects and sculptors.

== Early life ==
Wyatt was born in London, the son of the architect James Wyatt and was the brother of Benjamin Dean Wyatt, the architect. Matthew was educated at Eton College and joined the Royal Academy Schools in 1800. On 29 December 1801 he married Maria McClellan (d. 1852), the widow of Edward McClellan, a sea captain. They had fours sons, Matthew, James, George, and Henry Wyatt.

Through the influences of his father, in 1805 at the age of 28, he was employed by George III on several works at Windsor Castle, restoring and extending Antonio Verrio's ceilings in the remodelled state rooms. From 1800 to 1814 Wyatt exhibited portraits and historical subjects in oils at the Royal Academy. He was proposed for associate membership of the Academy in 1812, but was not elected and never became a member. At about this time he taught himself modelling and carving, moving from painting to sculpture, hoping to benefit from the proposals for great memorials after the Battle of Waterloo in 1815. His first public work was a memorial sculpture to Lord Nelson that was unveiled at Exchange Flags Square in Liverpool, in October 1813.

== Later career ==
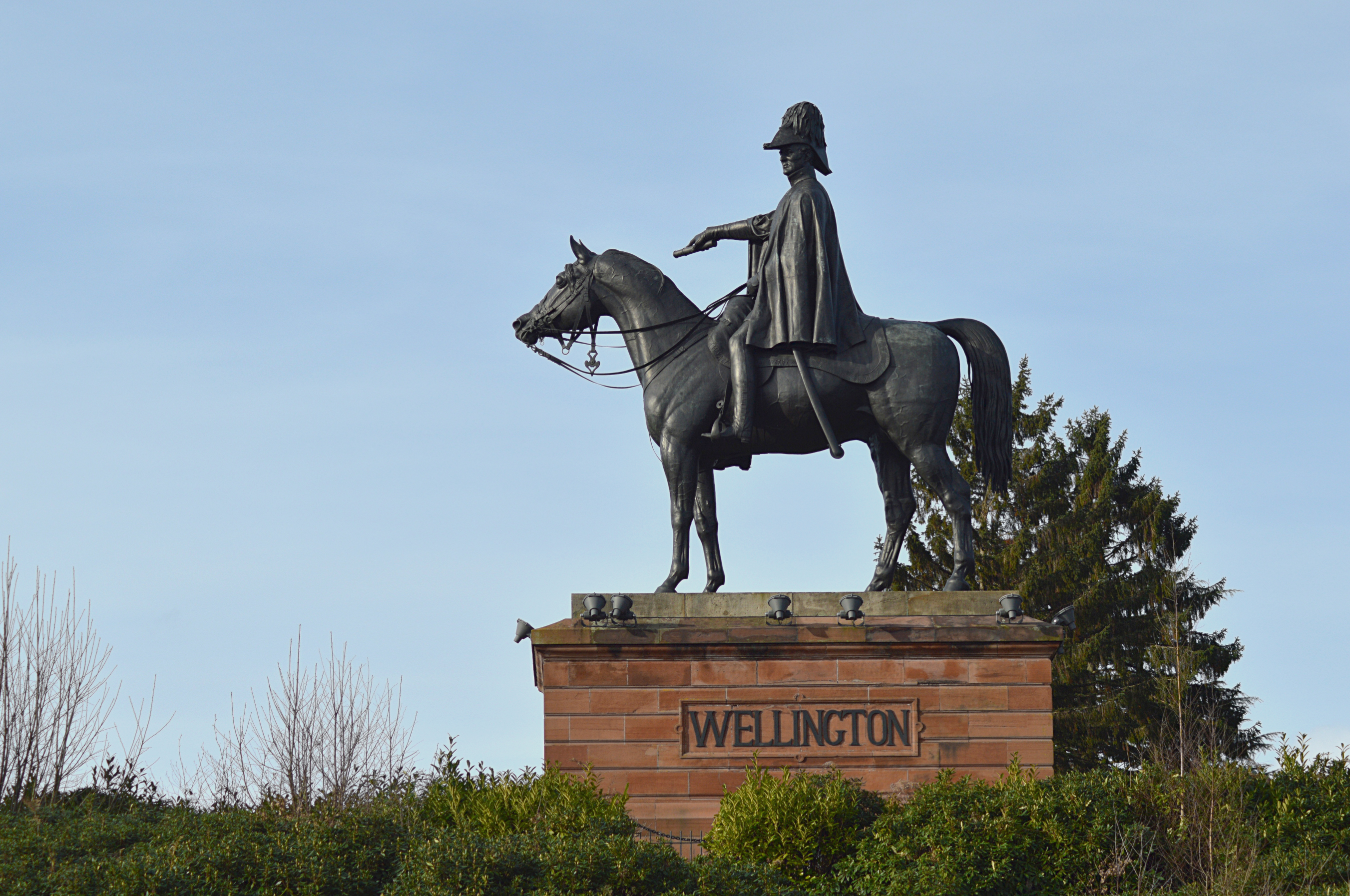
Wyatt's equestrian statue of the Duke of Wellington, now in Aldershot

However, it was the marble cenotaph to the memory of Princess Charlotte, the daughter of George IV, in St George's Chapel at Windsor Castle that firmly established Wyatt's reputation, and in 1832 a committee of subscribers commissioned him to sculpt a bronze equestrian statue of George III which now stands at the junction of Pall Mall East and Cockspur Street.

Wyatt also sculpted the enormous bronze equestrian statue of the Duke of Wellington which originally stood on the top of the Wellington Arch at Hyde Park Corner. This was erected in 1846, but many thought the statue was too large for the arch and it was taken down and re-erected in Aldershot in 1885, where it has been recently restored.

The Duke of Rutland employed Wyatt extensively at Belvoir Castle in Leicestershire, where he designed and decorated the Elizabeth Saloon and carved the marble monument to the Duchess in the mausoleum, as well as her full-length statue and bust. He also carved a marble table, complete with cloth, in the dining-room.

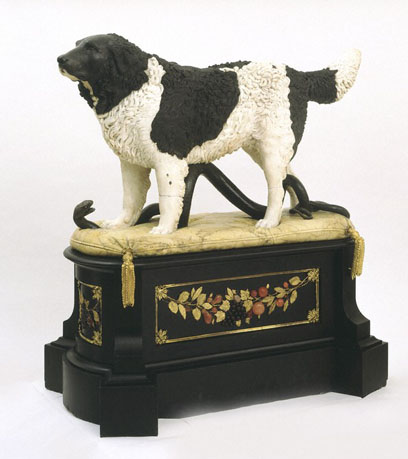
Bashaw, The Faithful Friend of Man Trampling under Foot his most Insidious Enemy by Matthew Cotes Wyatt, Victoria and Albert Museum, 1833

In 1831 John Ward, 1st Earl of Dudley commissioned Wyatt to sculpt his favourite hound Bashaw, offering to pay the then astronomical sum of 5,000 guineas for the finished work. Bashaw was taken to Wyatt's studio in London around 50 times to sit for the sculptor. Lord Dudley donated Persian topaz and sardonyx from the family jewel collection for the sculpture's eyes. However, Lord Dudley died in 1833 before it was completed and his executors refused to pay Wyatt his fee, so he retained the sculpture, exhibiting it several times, including at The Great Exhibition of 1851.

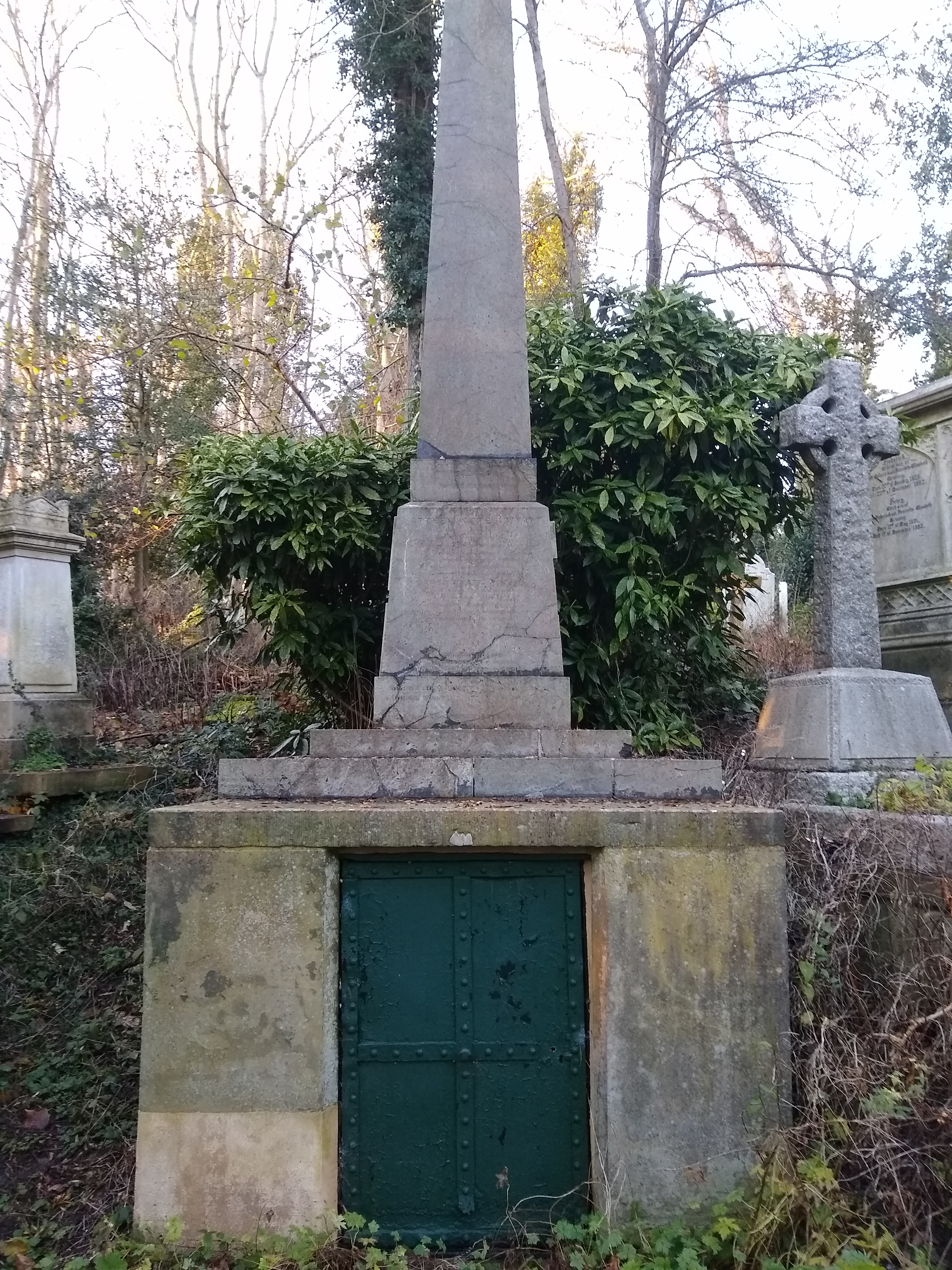
Wyatt family vault at Comfort's Corner in Highgate Cemetery (West side)

== Legacy ==
Wyatt died at his home, Dudley Grove House, Harrow Road, London, on 3 January 1862, and was buried in Highgate Cemetery, leaving an estate valued at c.£80,000. Matthew, his eldest son, later became the standard-bearer of Queen Victoria's Honourable Corps of Gentlemen at Arms, and was knighted in 1848. James (1808 – 1893) followed his father's profession and designed the pediment of the Commercial Bank of Scotland in George Street, Edinburgh. The other sons, George Wyatt (d. 1880) and Henry Wyatt (d. 1899), were both architects and builders and were involved in the development of the Bishop of London's estate in Paddington.

== See also ==
- Wyatt family
- Wellington Statue, Aldershot
