= Duke of York Column =

Monument in London

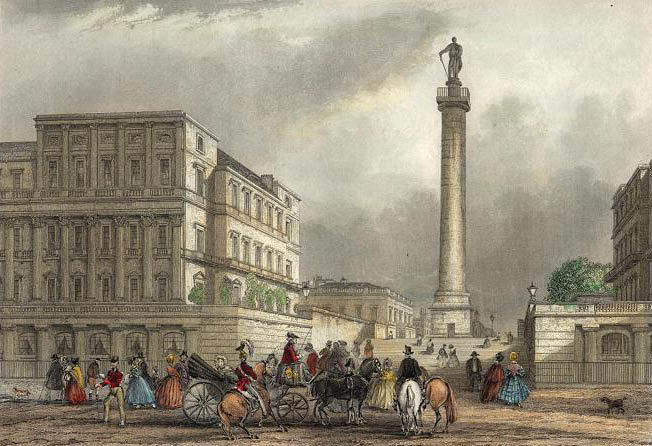
- 1837 view of the Duke of York Column above the Duke of York Steps seen from The Mall
- Location: London, England
- Coordinates: 51°30′22.8″N 0°7′54.5″W
- Designer: Benjamin Dean Wyatt
- Type: Monument
- Height: 137 ft 9 in
- Weight: 16,840 pounds
- Opening date: 10 April 1834
- Dedicated to: Prince Frederick, Duke of York

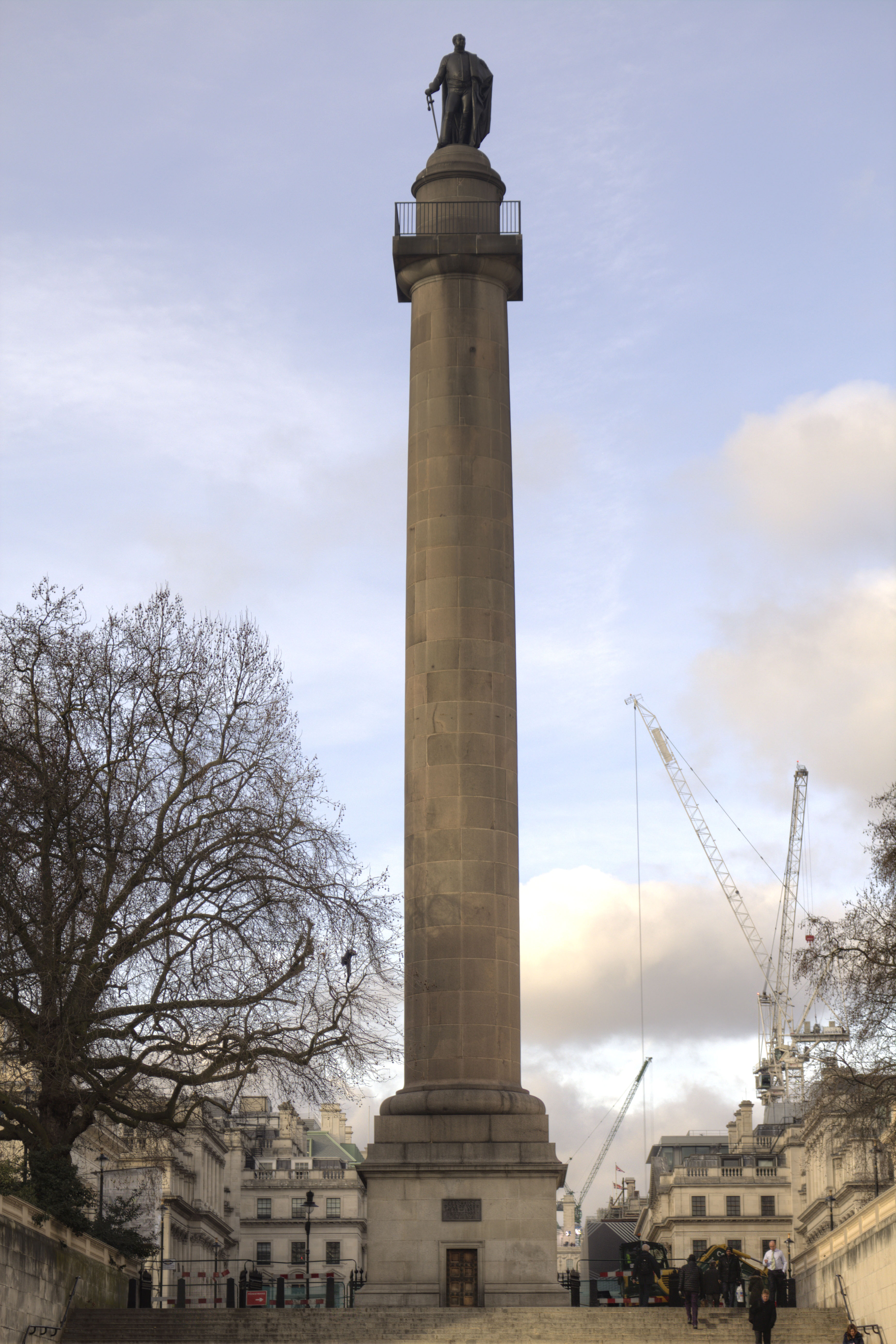
Duke of York monument from The Mall

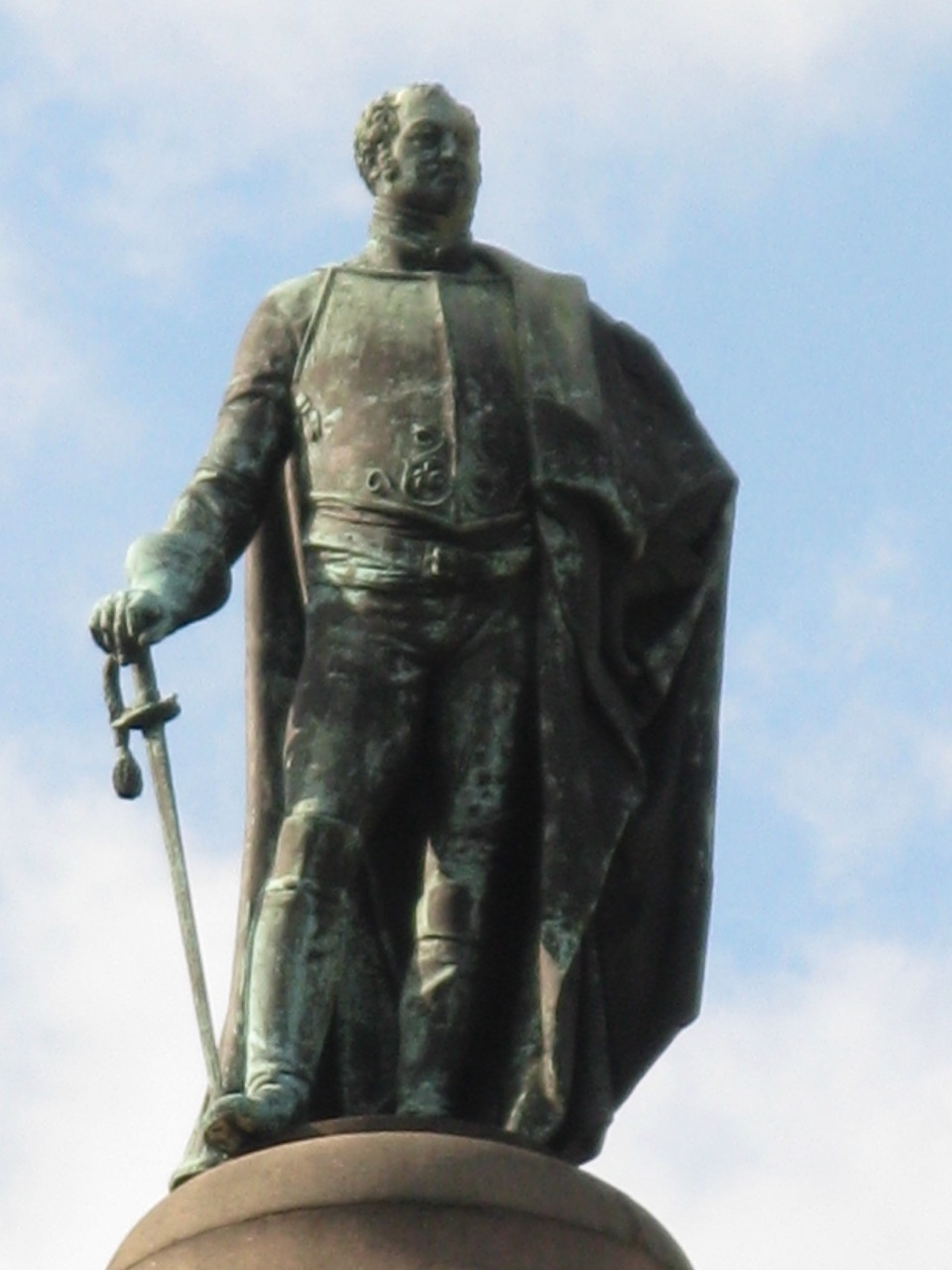
Duke of York statue by Richard Westmacott

The Duke of York Column is a monument in London, England, to Prince Frederick, Duke of York, the second son of King George III. The designer was Benjamin Dean Wyatt. It is sited where a purposefully wide endpoint of Regent Street, known as Waterloo Place and Gardens, meets The Mall, between the two terraces of Carlton House Terrace and their tree-lined squares. The three very wide flights of steps down to The Mall adjoining are known as the Duke of York Steps. The column was completed in December 1832, and the statue of the Duke of York, by Sir Richard Westmacott, was raised on 10 April 1834.

== History ==
Prince Frederick, Duke of York and Albany, was the commander-in-chief of the British Army during the French Revolutionary Wars and led the reform of the army into a capable modernised force. The Duke is remembered in the children's nursery rhyme "The Grand Old Duke of York". When he died in 1827, the entire British Army, by general consensus following a proposal of the senior officers, forwent one day's wages to pay for a monument to the Duke.

When the sum of subscriptions for a monument to the Duke reached £21,000 (equivalent to £2,296,388 in 2023), the committee overseeing the project asked a number of architects to submit proposals, and in December 1830 they chose a design by Benjamin Dean Wyatt. The mason Nowell of Pimlico was contracted to build the column for a sum of £15,760. Excavations for the concrete foundations began on 27 April 1831. The ground was excavated to a layer of natural soil, around 22 ft 0 in (6.71 m) below street level. A layer of York stone slabs at a depth of around 11 ft 0 in (3.35 m) was used to consolidate the concrete, and another was placed at the top of the foundations, as a base for the masonry. The foundations were completed on 25 June 1831, and construction of the stonework began three weeks later.

On 7 May 1850, Henri Joseph Stephan, a horn player in Benjamin Lumley's orchestra at Her Majesty's Theatre, committed suicide by falling from the public gallery at the top of the column.

== Description ==
The column is of the Tuscan order. It is built of granite from Aberdeenshire; a light grey variety was used for the pedestal, a bluer grey type for the base of the shaft, and 'red' Peterhead granite (pink/grey) for the shaft of the column. There is an iron railing around the abacus of the capital. Above the column a circular plinth, then a bronze statue of the Duke dressed in the robes of the Knights of the Garter, by Sir Richard Westmacott. The statue is slightly more than twice life-size, at 13 ft 6 in (4.11 m) tall and weighs 16,840 pounds (7,640 kg). It was raised into position on 8 April 1834.

The total height of the monument is 137 ft 9 in (41.99 m). The statue faces south-southeast; from its base, there are views of The Mall and St. James's Park. The great height of the column caused contemporary wits to joke that the Duke was trying to escape his creditors, for the Duke died £2 million in debt.

Within the column a spiral staircase of 168 steps, lit by narrow apertures, to the viewing platform. Given the small, fragile platform and the previous high demand for access, this column has been closed to the public for many decades.

The column is set at the top of a monumental flight of steps forming a break in Carlton House Terrace, The ensemble was designed by architect John Nash as an emphatic southern termination of his Via Triumphalis from Regent's Park to Westminster, envisaged and mostly realised 1815–1820. The Column, Steps and Terrace occupy the site of the Prince Regent's spectacular but short-lived Carlton House. The houses in the Terrace were popular with the gentry and wealthy, later joined by politicians such as William Ewart Gladstone. Both Column and Terrace are Grade I-listed, the houses in the terrace being described as 'palatial' by Historic England.

== Bibliography ==
- "Prince Frederick, Duke of York and Albany", The Mechanic's Magazine, Museum, Register, Journal and Gazette, Vol. 574, 9 August 1834, pp. 306–311 – a contemporary report on the building of the monument.
