= Government Wine Cellar =

Wine cellar of the government of the United Kingdom

Coordinates: 51°30′14″N 0°8′21″W

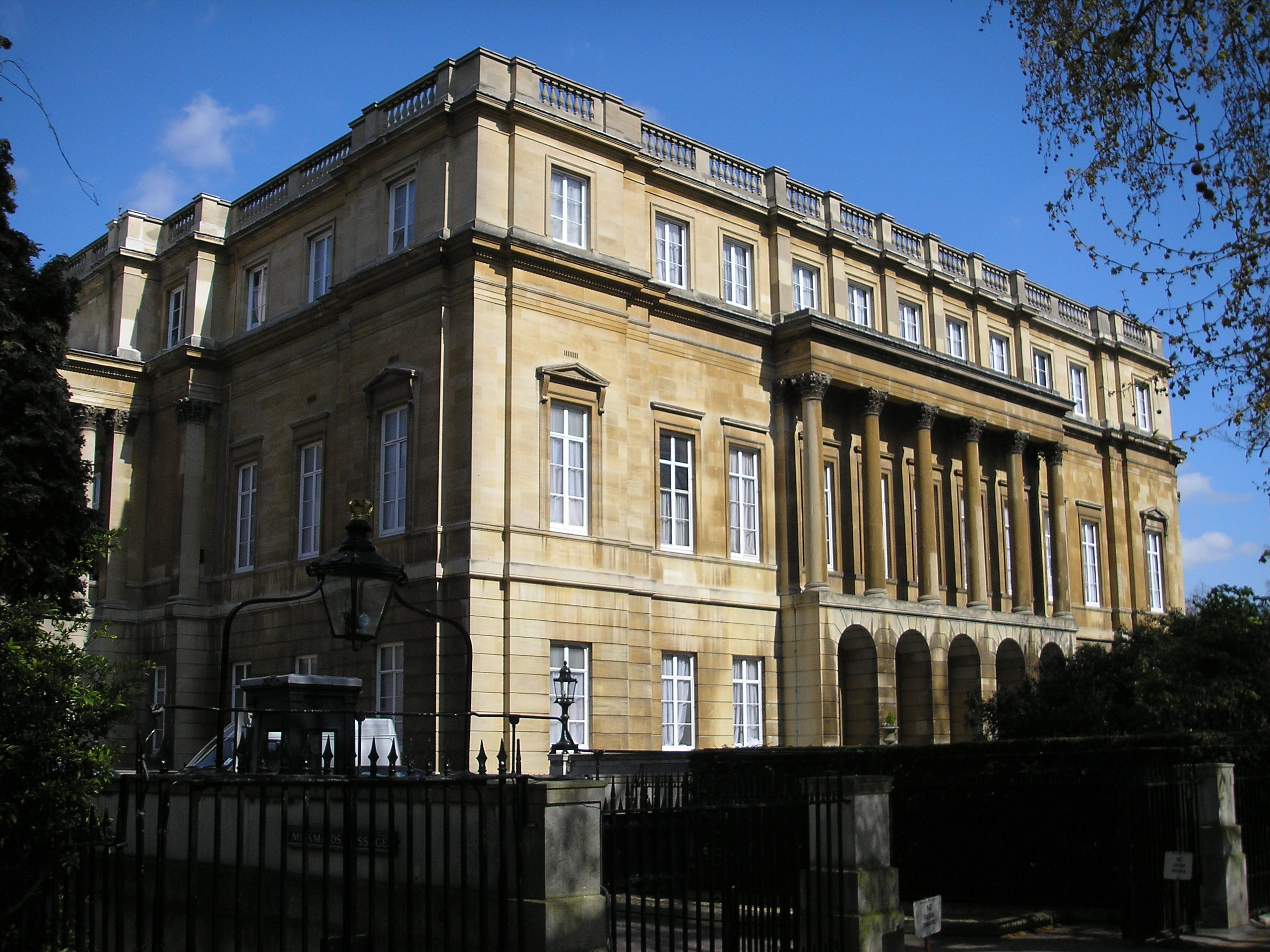
Lancaster House, the cellar of which houses the government's wine collection

The Government Wine Cellar (GWC) is a provider of wine to support the hospitality work of the United Kingdom's government. It was founded in 1908 and since 1922 has been housed in a cellar of Lancaster House in London. The cellar is estimated to contain around 39,000 bottles of wine and spirits estimated at a value of over £2 million.

The cellar is managed day-to-day by the Government Butler and is overseen by the head of Government Hospitality coming under the jurisdiction of the Foreign Office. It was originally stocked on the advice of the Government Hospitality Advisory Committee for the Purchase of Wine, a quango that was abolished in 2010. Before its abolition, the committee met two or three times a year in the cellar, around a table carved from an elm tree that blew down in St James's Park in around 1830. The role of the committee was to taste the wines, make recommendations for new purchases to keep the cellar stocked, and to sell a portion on the open market to fund the restocking process. They also graded the wines and offered serving suggestions.

Since 2010 the cellar has been stocked according to recommendations from a specialist committee of Masters of Wine, chaired by a former diplomat. Aside from the Government Butler, access to the cellar is strictly limited to Permanent Secretaries and Ministers.

The wine is served according to a complex system. Ministers are asked to give their preferences when they take office. Food being served at the banquet or function is usually factored in. National sensitivities and customs are also considered – for example when there is a Chinese delegation vintages from 1988 are used, as '8' is considered a lucky number in China.

The cellar includes wines from Château Lafite, Cheval Blanc, Cos d’Estournel, Mouton Rothschild and Le Pin. It had previously held over seventeen different types of Champagne including a magnum of Champagne Krug 1964 and still holds such valuable spirits as an 1878 Grand Fins Bois Cognac and 1931 Quinta do Noval Port. English and Welsh wines are estimated to make up 44% of all those served in 2016, including Nyetimber’s demi-sec. The Foreign Office have stated that the most the cellar has ever spent on a single bottle of wine is £100.

== See also ==
- Government Art Collection
- Government Brokers
