= Benjamin Dean Wyatt =

English architect

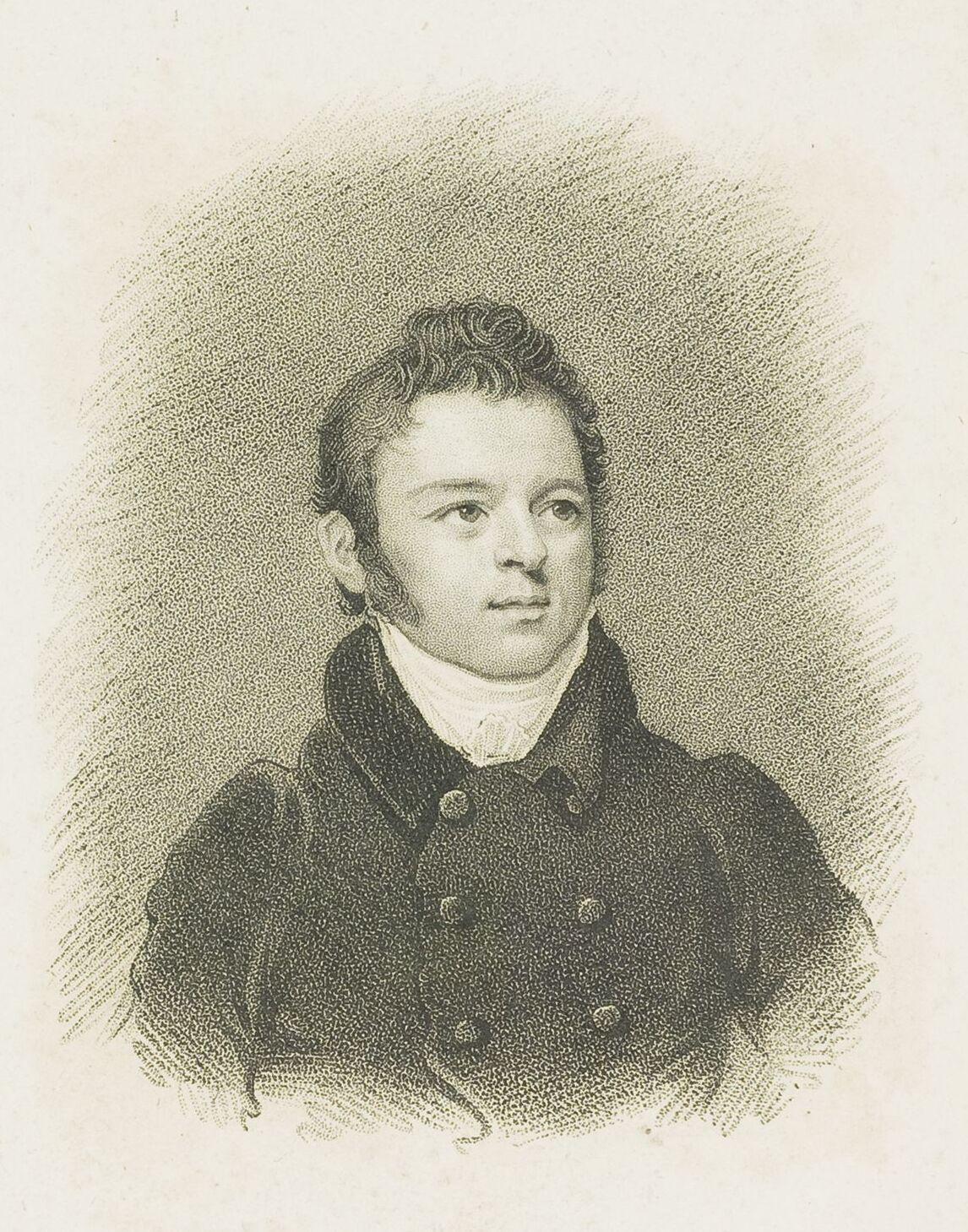
Benjamin Dean Wyatt, stipple engraving by T. Blood, after Samuel Drummond. Dated 1812

Benjamin Dean Wyatt (1775–1852) was an English architect, part of the Wyatt family.

== Early life ==
He was the son and pupil of the architect James Wyatt, and the brother of Matthew Cotes Wyatt. Before setting up as an architect in 1809, he joined the Civil Service of the East India Company, working in the office of Lord Wellesley, in Calcutta. Afterwards, in Dublin he was employed as private secretary to Wellesley's brother Arthur, later the Duke of Wellington.

In 1811, Wyatt won the competition to rebuild the Theatre Royal, Drury Lane, which had been destroyed by fire in 1809. Construction began in October 1811, and the theatre opened a year later. Wyatt based the design of the auditorium partly on that of the theatre at Bordeaux, which was reputed to have the best acoustics in Europe. In 1813 he published Observations on the Design for the Theatre Royal, Drury Lane.

He succeeded his father in the post of Surveyor of the Fabric of Westminster Abbey from 1813 to 1827.

== The Duke of Wellington ==
When Arthur Wellesley returned from the Peninsula War in 1814, he was created 1st Duke of Wellington, and the government offered to buy him a residence. Wellington called in Wyatt to advise him. Wyatt advocated a building that produced "a very magnificent & imposing effect" without "the monstrous expense of a Fabrick extended to the dimensions of Blenheim [or] Castle Howard".

Without having found an appropriate site, he drew up a set of plans, which he presented to Wellington in Paris, a few months after the Duke's victory at Waterloo. His idea was to lay out the buildings around three sides of a large courtyard with rounded corners, entered through a colonnaded screen. The main block of the house was planned around an octagonal staircase hall, with a coffered dome pierced by an oculus, in the manner of the Pantheon in London, designed by his father James Wyatt. The architect had to produce a number of variations before the Duke finally gave his approval in November 1815. Wyatt then produced a set of working drawings, which included detailed instructions for the Neoclassical decoration.

In 1817 the trustees appointed by Parliament to provide the duke with a house bought an estate at Stratfield Saye, Hampshire, for Wellington's use, and Wyatt was confident that the palace would be built there, despite the coolness that the trustees had previously shown towards his designs. However, in early 1818, it was decided that the existing house could be modified; Wyatt was paid for his drawings and the project shelved.

In 1819 Wyatt began work on improvements to Apsley House, Wellington's London home. In the first phase of the work, he added a three-storey extension to the north east, housing a State Dining Room, bedrooms and dressing rooms.

A second phase, started after Wellington had become Prime Minister in 1828, included a new staircase and the Louis XIV style "Waterloo Gallery" on the west front of the house. The exterior – previously red-brick – was clad in Bath stone, and a pedimented portico added. Wyatt's original estimate for the work was £23,000, but the need to repair structural defects discovered during the work led to costs escalating to more than £61,000.

== Other houses ==
He added a two-storey north wing to Westport House in Mayo, Ireland in 1816 for the 2nd Marquess of Sligo. This wing contained staff accommodation and kitchen facilities. This was followed by a corresponding South wing of 1819 which contained a two-storey high library surrounded with a mezzanine floor supported on cast iron brackets which gave access to the books. This wing was lost in a fire of 1826 due to the overheating of the technically advanced hot air heating system. Wyatt's original drawings for the library survive in Westport House.

Wyatt was influential in reviving the Rococo style in England during the mid-1820s. He designed the interiors of Belvoir Castle (1825–30), including the Dining Room, Picture Gallery, Elizabeth Saloon and, in the grounds, a Romanesque-style mausoleum.

== Later works in London ==
With his brother, Philip William (d. 1835), he designed Crockford's Club (1827), 50–3 St James's Street, Londonderry House (1825–28) demolished 1964 and the Oriental Club in Hanover Square (1827–1828). He was the designer of Duke of York Column, erected 1831–34. Also he was the involved in the design of Lancaster House, designing the exterior (the top floor was added by Sir Robert Smirke) and the state rooms.

== Pupils ==
The architects Alexander Dick Gough and Robert Lewis Roumieu were articled to him in 1823 and 1831 respectively.

== Gallery of architectural work ==
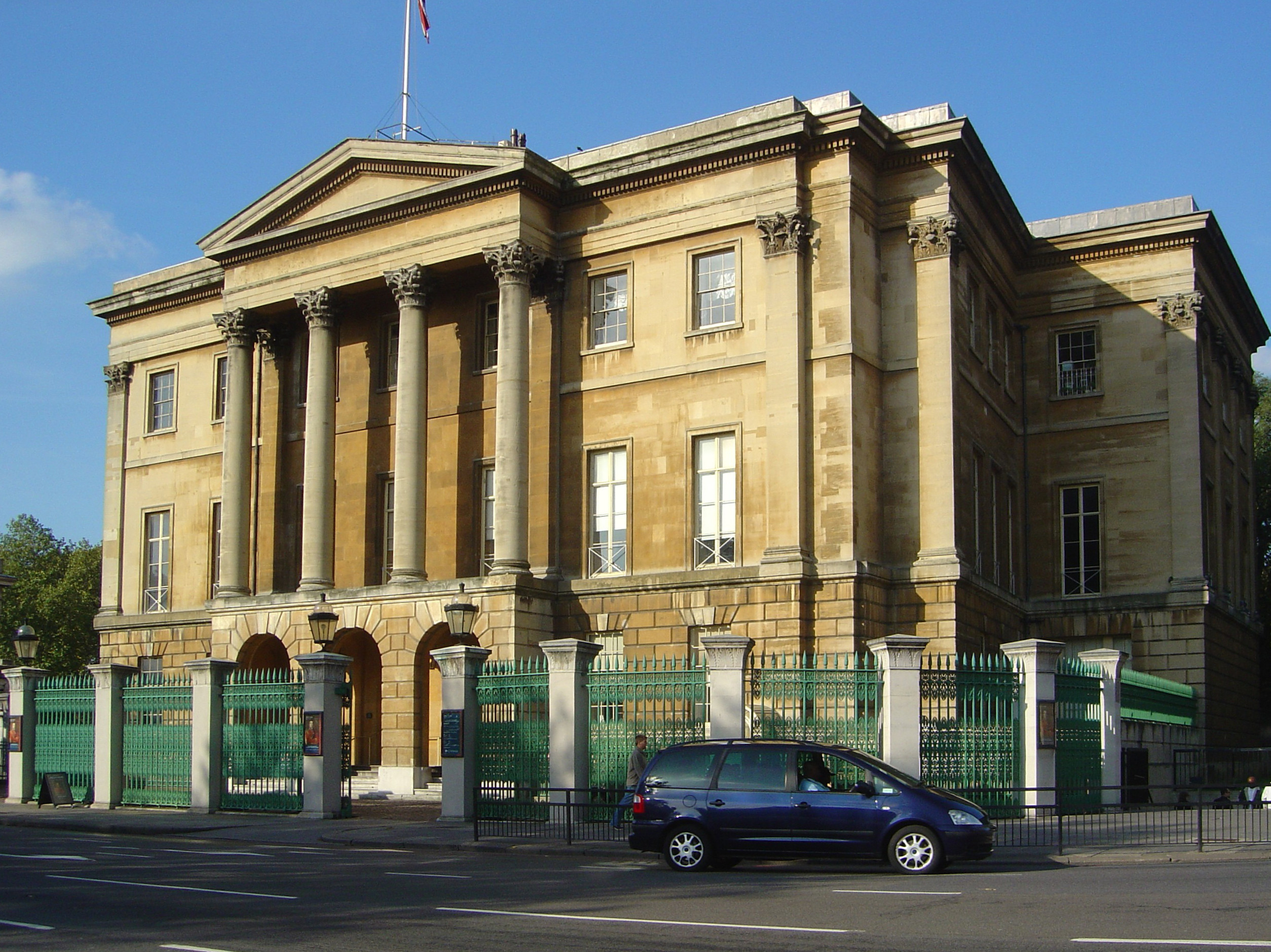
Apsley House, London

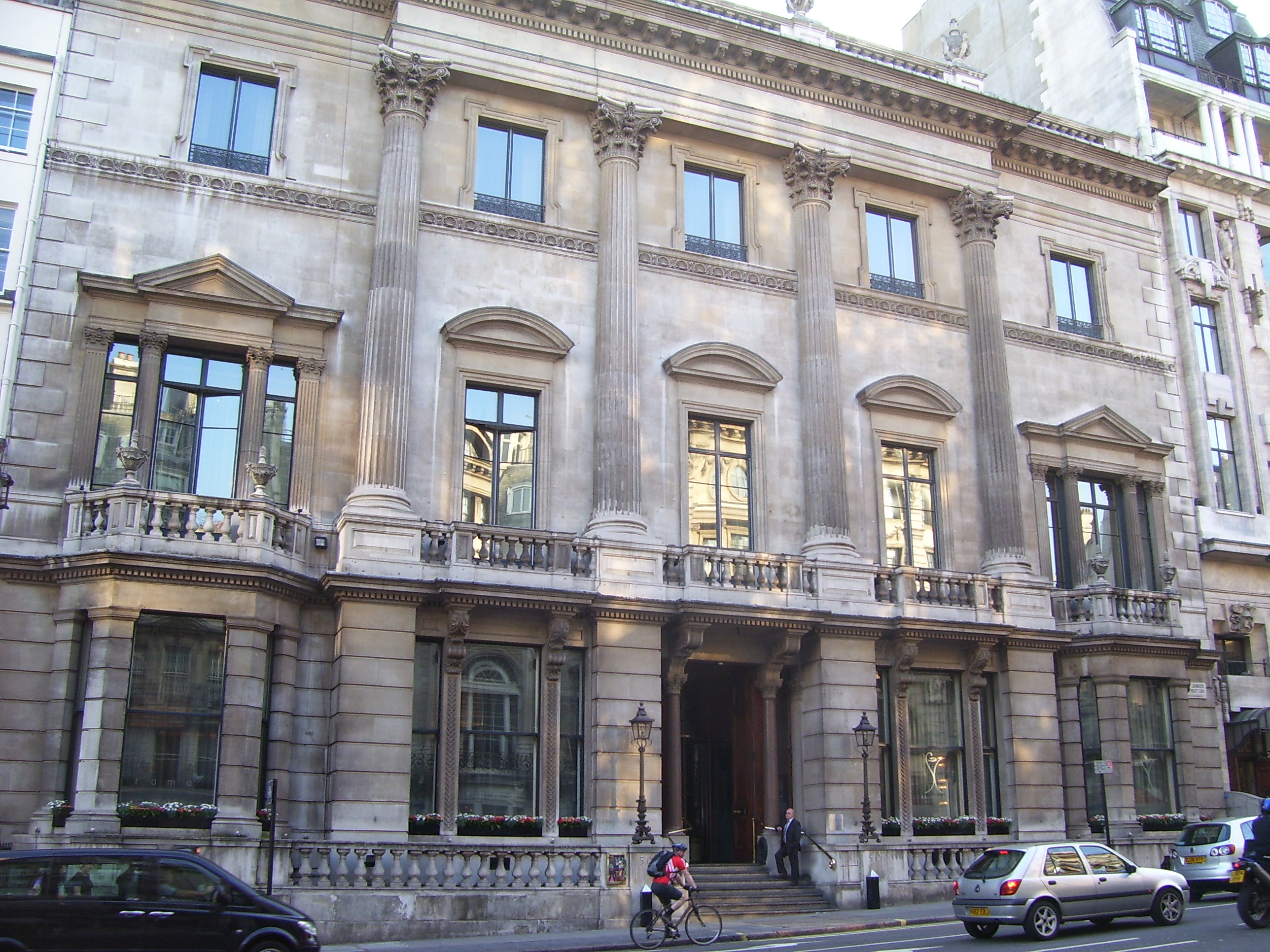
Crockford's Club, London joint work with his brother Philip Wyatt

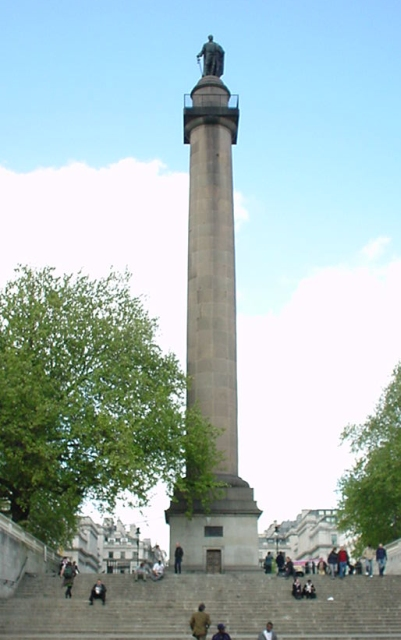
Duke of York Column

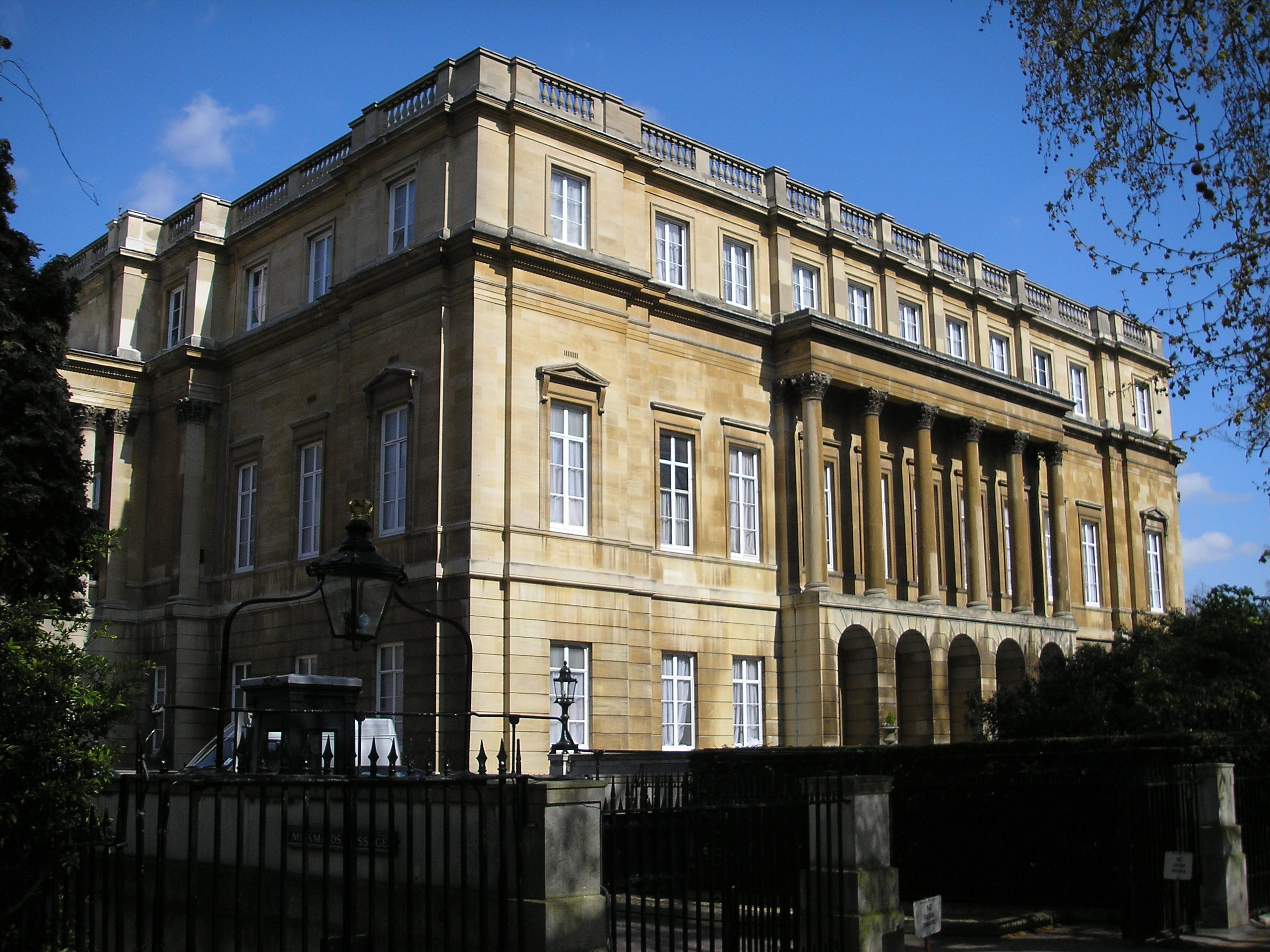
Lancaster House

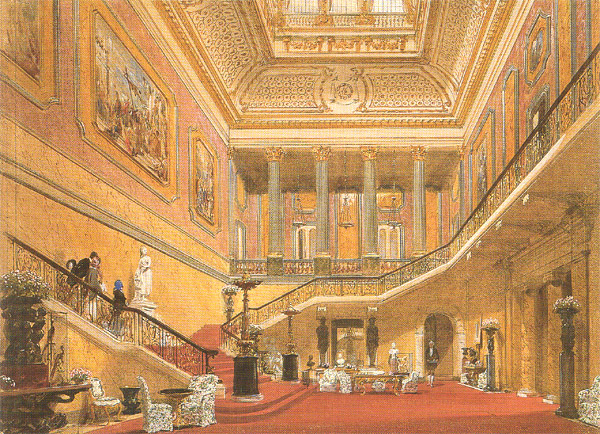
The Great Staircase, Lancaster House

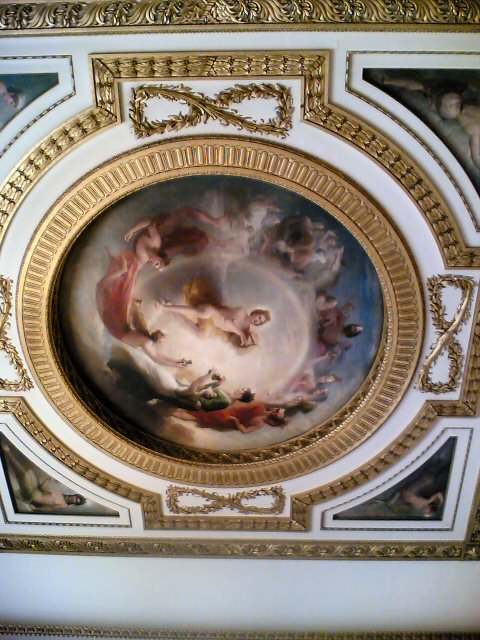
The ceiling, South-West Drawing Room, Lancaster House

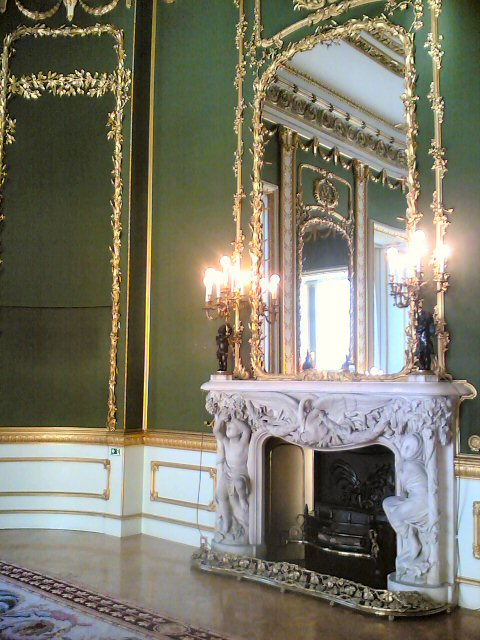
Fireplace, South-West Drawing Room, Lancaster House

== See also ==
- Wyatts, an architectural dynasty
