= Philip Wyatt =

Philip William Wyatt (5 March 1785 – 1835) was an English architect and member of the Wyatt family. He was the youngest son of the architect James Wyatt and his wife Rachel (Lunn) Wyatt, and a nephew of Samuel Wyatt, cousin to Sir Jeffry Wyatville (born Wyatt).

His two major commissions were Conishead Priory (1821–36), a large Gothic Revival mansion in Lancashire and Wynyard Park, County Durham a large Neo-Classical Mansion for the 3rd Marquess of Londonderry 1822–30.

His brother Benjamin Dean Wyatt was also an architect and collaborated on some commissions with him, such as the new club house in Hanover Square for the Oriental Club (1827–28), also they were joint architects for Crockford's Club, 50 St James's Street, London (1827) and Londonderry House (1825–28) demolished 1964.

== Gallery ==
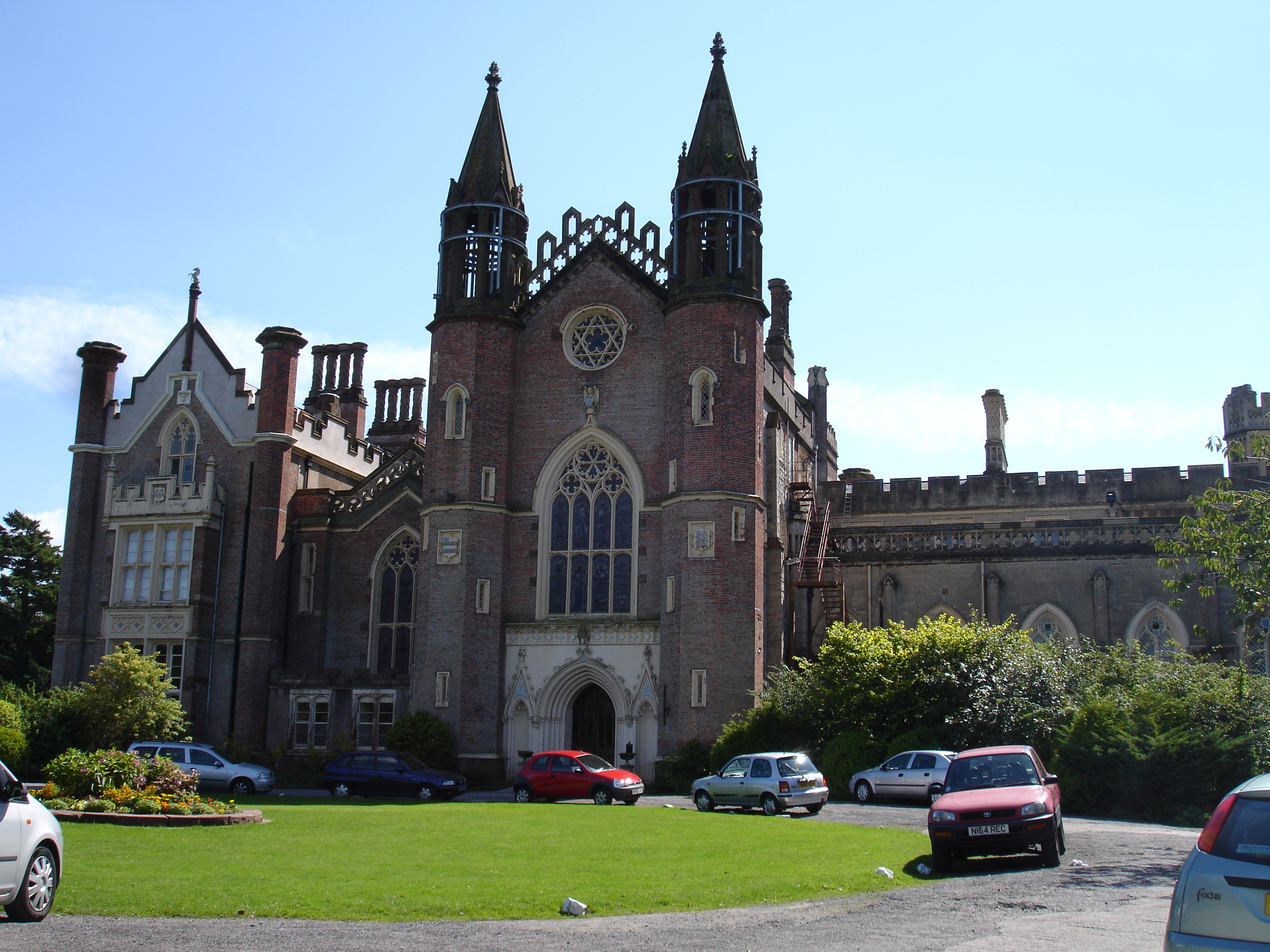
Conishead Priory

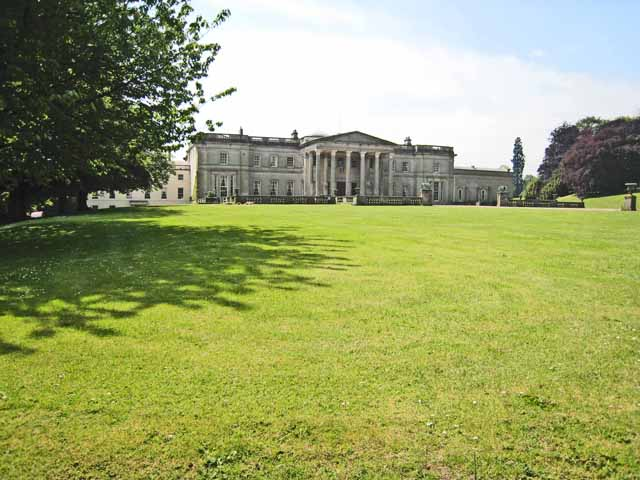
Wynyard Park

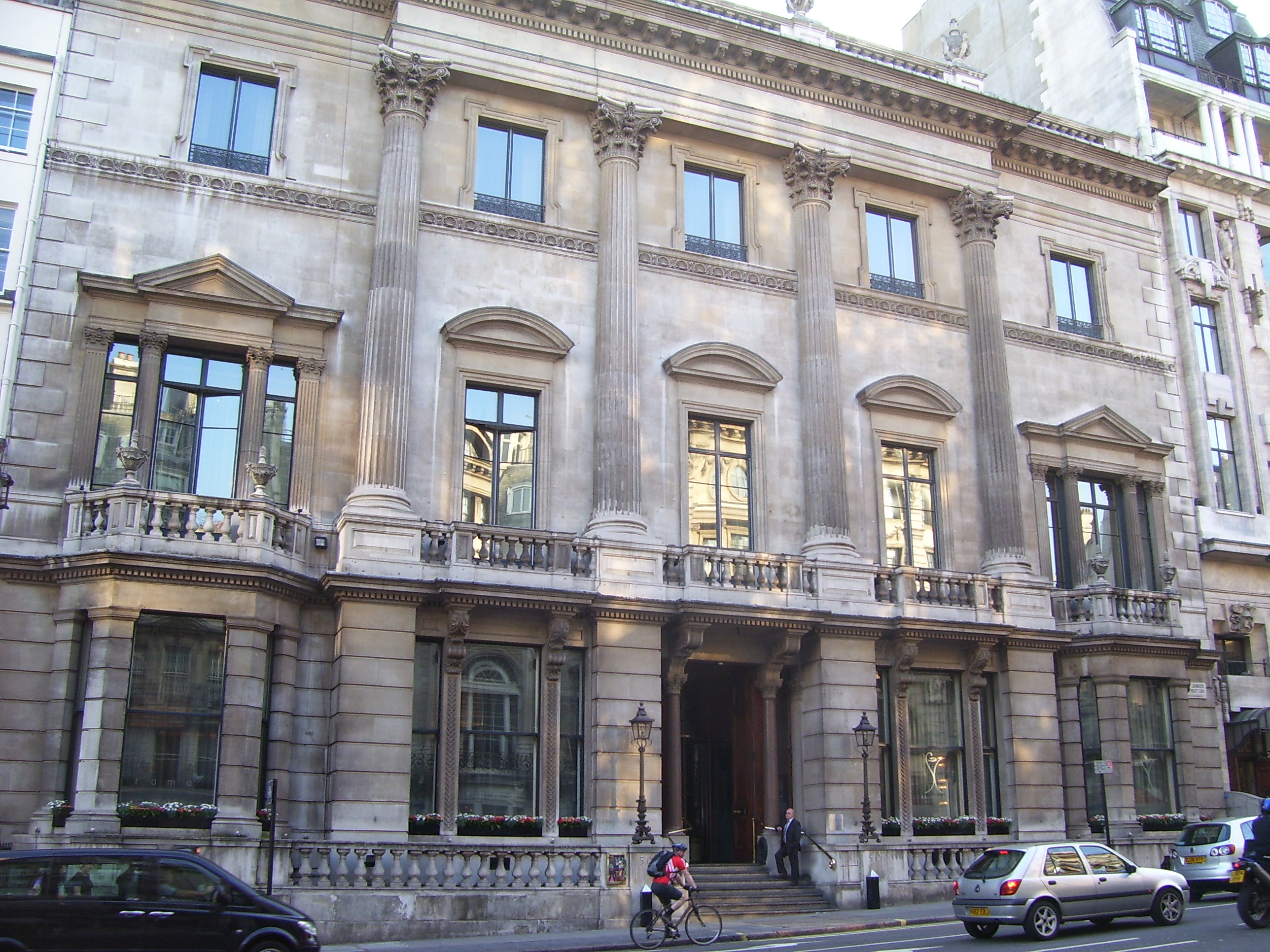
Crockford's Club, London joint work with his brother Benjamin Dean Wyatt

== See also ==
- Wyatt family
