= Wyatt family =

Family of major English architects

The Wyatt family included several of the major English architects during the 18th and 19th centuries, and a significant 18th century inventor, John Wyatt (1700–1766), the eldest son of John Wyatt (1675–1742).

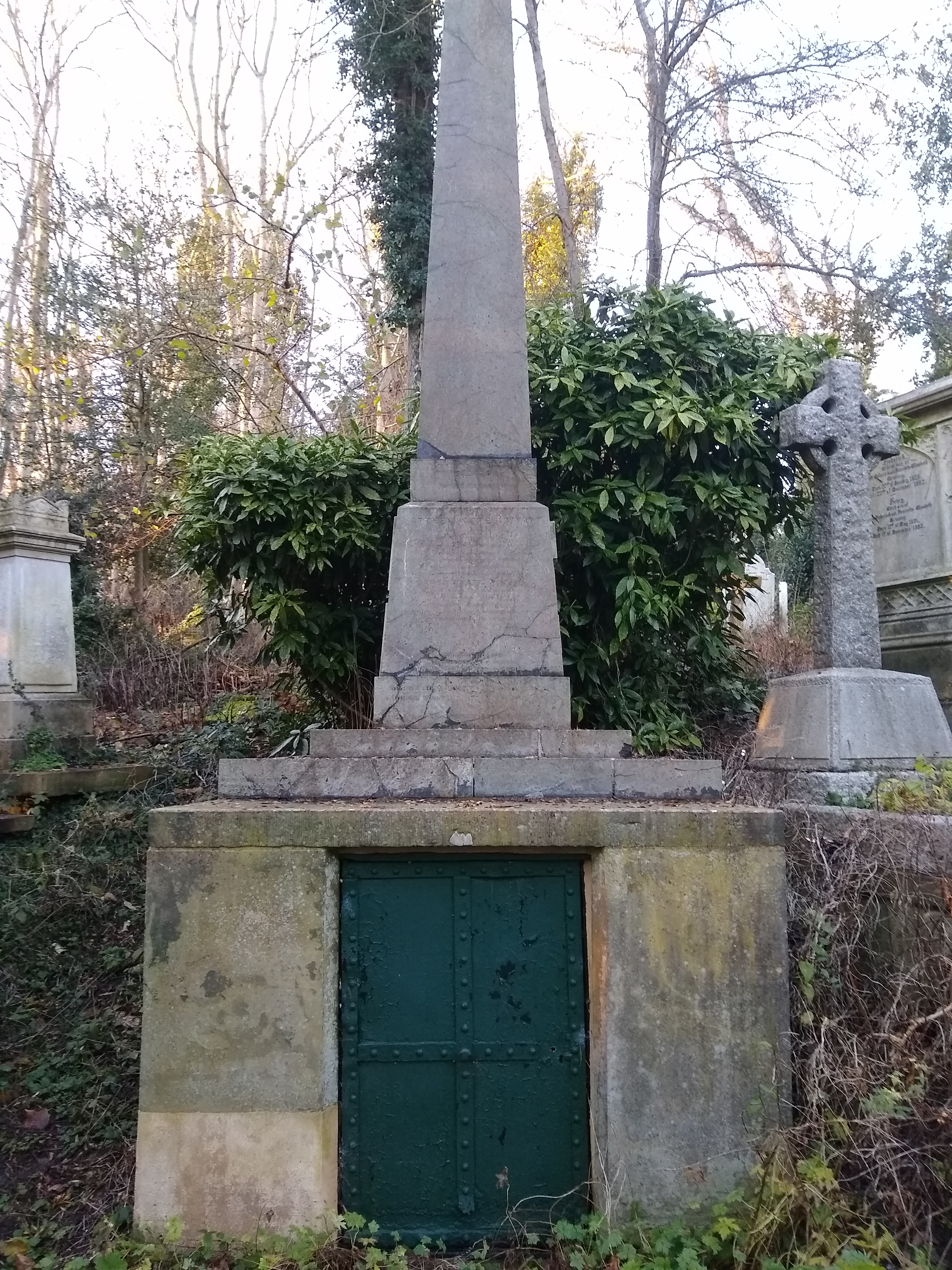
Wyatt family vault at Comfort's Corner in Highgate Cemetery (West side)

== The family ==
This is a summary tree to show the linkages. It is an extract from the tree by Robinson.

== Benjamin Wyatt ==
Benjamin (1709–1772), of Blackbrook, Staffordshire, sixth of the eight sons of John Wyatt, married Mary Wright and had seven sons and three daughters.

== William Wyatt ==
William (1734–1780), eldest son of Benjamin's ten children; married his cousin, Sarah, daughter of his father Benjamin's elder brother, William. He had four sons: Charles, Henry, Robert Harvey, and Samuel. Robert Harvey Wyatt was great-great grandfather of the politician Woodrow Wyatt.

== Samuel Wyatt ==
Samuel Wyatt (1737–1807), third son of Benjamin.

== Joseph Wyatt ==
Joseph Wyatt (1739–1785), fourth son of Benjamin. He married his cousin, Myrtilla, daughter of William Wyatt (1702–1772).

== Benjamin Wyatt II ==
Benjamin Wyatt (1744–1818), fifth son of Benjamin. He married Sarah, daughter and co-heiress of William Forde, and had seven sons and six daughters. His sixth son, James Wyatt, lived at Bryn Gwynant, Caernarvonshire, and was head of that branch of the family of Wyatt, later of Hurst Barton Manor, Somerset.

== James Wyatt ==
James Wyatt (3 August 1746 – 4 September 1813) was an architect, a rival of Robert Adam in the neoclassical style, who far outdid Adam in his work in the neo-Gothic style. Sixth son of Benjamin (1709–1772).

== Charles Wyatt ==
Charles Wyatt (1758–1813) was an architect who worked in India; eldest son of William Wyatt (1734–1780) and a nephew of James Wyatt.

== Jeffry Wyatville ==
Sir Jeffry Wyatville (1766–1840) was an architect and garden designer. Son of Joseph Wyatt.

== Benjamin Dean Wyatt ==
Benjamin Dean Wyatt (1775–1852) was an architect. He was the eldest son and pupil of the architect James Wyatt.

== Matthew Cotes Wyatt ==
Matthew Cotes Wyatt (1777–1862), second son of James Wyatt; a painter and sculptor.

== Lewis Wyatt ==
Lewis Wyatt (1777–1853) was an English architect, son of Benjamin Wyatt II and a nephew of James Wyatt.

== Philip William Wyatt ==
Philip William Wyatt (?–1835) was an English architect, the youngest son of the architect James Wyatt nephew of Samuel Wyatt, cousin to Sir Jeffry Wyattville.

== Matthew Digby Wyatt ==
Sir (Matthew) Digby Wyatt (28 July 1820 – 21 May 1877) was an architect and art historian who became Secretary of the Great Exhibition, Surveyor of the East India Company and the first Slade Professor of Fine Art at the University of Cambridge.

== Thomas Henry Wyatt ==
Thomas Henry Wyatt (9 May 1807 – 5 August 1880), a noted architect.

== Sir Matthew Wyatt ==
Sir Matthew Wyatt (1805–1886), architect and son of Matthew Cotes Wyatt. He built and designed Victoria Square, London (1838–40), created houses in Stanhope Terrace, Westbourne and Bathurst Streets, and developed land bounded by Connaught, Southwick, and Hyde Park Streets and Hyde Park Square. He was also involved in the redevelopment of 50 Grosvenor Square (1849).
