= Lancaster House Conferences =

Lancaster House Conferences may refer to any of the following meetings that took place at Lancaster House in London:

- The Lancaster House Conferences (Nigeria) in 1957 and 1958 where the federal constitution for an independent Nigeria was prepared
- The Lancaster House Conferences (Kenya), three meetings (1960, 1962, 1963) in which Kenya's constitutional framework and independence were negotiated
- The Ugandan Constitutional Conference, held at Lancaster House in September and October 1961
- A Conference that led to the Lancaster House Agreement, the independence agreement for Rhodesia, now known as Zimbabwe

== See also ==
- The Lancaster House Agreement of September 1965 where the independence of Mauritius was agreed to on the terms that the Chagos Islands would be separated and retained by the UK. This agreement has been the subject of the Chagos Archipelago sovereignty dispute as it is argued that the agreement was signed under duress.
- The Lancaster House Treaties, an Anglo-French military co-operation agreement signed in 2010, sometimes collectively referred to as the "Lancaster House Agreement"
