= List of equestrian statues in the United Kingdom =

The following is a list of equestrian statues in the United Kingdom and includes equestrian statues, where a rider is mounted on a horse; and equine statues, where the horse is riderless, and/or the rider the is dismounted. The list includes statues situated in the United Kingdom, in addition to the Channel Islands.

== England ==
=== Bristol ===
Image	Title / subject	Location and coordinates	Date	Artist / designer	Type	Material	Dimensions	Designation	Wikidata	Notes
More images	Statue of William III	Queen Square, Bristol	1736	John Michael Rysbrack	Statue on pedestal	Brass and stone		Grade I	Q5384424	
More images	John Wesley	New Room, Bristol	1932	Arthur George Walker	Statue on pedestal	Bronze and limestone		Grade II	Q26571319	
	Cloaked Horseman	Narrow Lewins Mead, Bristol	1984	David Backhouse	Statue	Bronze resin				
	Horse and Man	Brunel House, St Georges Road, Bristol	1984	Stephen Joyce	Sculpture group	Bronze resin				Located in the courtyard of the former Royal Western Hotel, now student accommodation.

=== Liverpool ===
Image	Title / subject	Location and coordinates	Date	Artist / designer	Type	Material	Dimensions	Designation	Wikidata	Notes
More images	George III	Monument Place, London Road, Liverpool	1822	Richard Westmacott	Statue on pedestal	Bronze and stone		Grade II	Q26629818	
More images	Albert, Prince Consort	St George's Hall, Liverpool	1866	Thomas Thornycroft	Statue on pedestal	Bronze and stone		Grade II	Q2633144	
More images	Queen Victoria	St George's Hall, Liverpool	1869	Thomas Thornycroft	Statue on pedestal	Bronze and stone		Grade II	Q26643648	
More images	Edward VII	Pier Head, Liverpool	1916	Goscombe John	Statue on pedestal	Bronze		Grade II	Q26320984	
	Red Rum	Aintree Racecourse	1987	Philip Blacker	Sculpture	Bronze				
More images	The Great Escape	Canning Place, next to Merseyside Police Headquarters	2000	Edward Cronshaw	Group sculpture	Bronze				
More images	Waiting - Liverpool Carters Working Horse monument	Museum of Liverpool, Pier Head	2010	Judy Boyt	Sculpture					
	Christ upon an ass	Church of Our Lady and Saint Nicholas, Liverpool		Brian Burgess	Sculpture	Bronze				

=== London ===
Image	Title / subject	Location and coordinates	Date	Artist / designer	Type	Material	Dimensions	Designation	Wikidata	Notes
More images	Statue of Charles I	Charing Cross	1633	Hubert Le Sueur	Statue on pedestal	Bronze and stone		Grade I	Q7604492	
More images	William III	St James's Square	1807	John Bacon the Younger	Statue on pedestal	Bronze and stone		Grade I	Q17527231	
More images	George III	Pall Mall	1835/6	Matthew Coates Wyatt	Statue on pedestal	Bronze and Portland stone		Grade II	Q19902765	
More images	George IV	Trafalgar Square	1840s	Sir Francis Chantrey	Statue on pedestal	Bronze and granite		Grade II	Q7604481	
More images	Statue of Arthur Wellesley, 1st Duke of Wellington	Royal Exchange, Cornhill	1844	Sir Francis Chantrey and Henry Weekes	Statue on pedestal	Bronze and granite		Grade II	Q18159872	
More images	Statue of Richard Coeur de Lion	Palace of Westminster	1856	Carlo Marochetti	Statue on pedestal	Bronze and granite		Grade II	Q7324819	
More images	Albert, Prince Consort	Holborn Circus	1874	Charles Bacon	Statue on pedestal	Bronze and granite		Grade II	Q23038443	
More images	Statue of Arthur Wellesley, 1st Duke of Wellington	Hyde Park Corner	1888	Joseph Edgar Boehm	Statue on pedestal with 4 statues	Bronze and stone		Grade II	Q18159875	
More images	Robert Napier, 1st Baron Napier of Magdala	Queen's Gate, Kensington	1891, relocated 1921	Joseph Edgar Boehm	Statue on pedestal	Bronze and granite		Grade II	Q26555957	
More images	Physical Energy	Kensington Gardens	1907	George Frederic Watts	Statue on pedestal	Bronze and granite		Grade II	Q18388413	
More images	Statue of Duke of Cambridge	Whitehall, opposite the War Office Building	1907	Adrian Jones	Statue on pedestal	Bronze and stone		Grade II	Q19516037	John Belcher (architect)
More images	Statue of Viscount Wolseley	Horse Guards Road, Whitehall	1920	William Goscombe John	Statue on pedestal	Bronze and stone		Grade II	Q18159880	Richard Allison (architect)
More images	Statue of Sir George Stuart White	Portland Place	1922	John Tweed	Statue on pedestal	Bronze and Portland stone		Grade II	Q18159865	
More images	Cavalry of the Empire Memorial	Hyde Park	1924	Adrian Jones	Statue on pedestal with surround	Bronze and Portland stone		Grade II*	Q20794956	Thomas Smith Tait & Sir John James Burnett (architects)
More images	Edward VII	Waterloo Place, St. James's Park	1924	Bertram Mackennal	Statue on pedestal	Bronze and Portland stone		Grade II	Q19930022	
More images	Statue of Frederick Roberts, 1st Earl Roberts	Horse Guards Road, Whitehall	1924	Henry Poole after Harry Bates	Statue on pedestal	Bronze and stone		Grade II	Q21286417	Richard Allison (architect).
More images	War Memorial	Prince Albert Road, outside St John's Wood Church	c.1925-1930	Charles Leonard Hartwell	Statue on pedestal	Bronze and Portland stone		Grade II	Q26555473	
More images	Statue of Ferdinand Foch	London Victoria station	1930	Georges Malissard	Statue on pedestal	Bronze and stone		Grade II*	Q26263414	P Lebret (architect)
More images	Memorial to Douglas Haig, 1st Earl Haig	Whitehall	1937	Alfred Frank Hardiman	Statue on pedestal	Bronze and stone		Grade II*	Q5325895	Stephen Rowland Pierce (architect)
	White Horse of Hanover	Palm House, Kew Gardens	1953	Sir Henry Ross (based on James Woodford)	Sculpture	Portland stone			Q22673788	One of ten statues known as the Queen's Beasts
More images	Horse and Rider	Town Square, New Bond Street	1975	Elisabeth Frink	Sculpture	Bronze	2.4m high	Grade II	Q25339096	
More images	The Messenger	Quadrant House, Sutton	1981	David Wynne	Sculpture on pedestal	Bronze and stone			Q18748777	
More images	Saint George and the Dragon	Dorset Rise	1988	Michael Sandle	Sculpture on column	Bronze			Q30303246	
More images	The Cnihtengild	Devonshire Square	1990	Denys Mitchell	Sculpture	Bronze				

=== The Midlands ===
Image	Title / subject	Location and coordinates	Date	Artist / designer	Type	Material	Dimensions	Designation	Wikidata	Notes
More images	Statue of George I	Barber Institute of Fine Arts, Birmingham	1722	Workshop of John Nost the Elder	Statue on pedestal	Bronze and stone		Grade II	Q26565300	Commissioned by the city of Dublin in 1717; sold to the Barber Institute in 1937.
More images	Albert, Prince Consort	Queen Square, Wolverhampton	1866	Thomas Thornycroft	Statue on pedestal	Bronze and granite		Grade II	Q26497548	
More images	Horse and Tamer	Malvern and Brueton Park, Solihull	1874	Joseph Edgar Boehm	Statue group on pedestal	Bronze and stone		Grade II	Q26626782	
More images	Lady Godiva	Broadgate, Coventry	1949	William Reid Dick	Statue on pedestal	Bronze and Portland stone		Grade II*	Q17540305	
	Iron Horse	Wolverhampton station, Wolverhampton	1987	Kevin Atherton	Sculpture	Painted steel	1.8m high x 2.4m long			One of a series of 12 between Wolverhampton and Birmingham New Street railway stations.
More images	Bonnie Prince Charlie	Cathedral Green, Derby	1995	Anthony Stone	Statue on pedestal	Bronze and sandstone	2.3m high			
	Horse and Rider	The Lunt, Wolverhampton		Tessa Pullan	Statue	Galvanised steel				

=== Northern England ===
Image	Title / subject	Location and coordinates	Date	Artist / designer	Type	Material	Dimensions	Designation	Wikidata	Notes
More images	King William III	Market Place, Kingston upon Hull	1734	Peter Scheemakers	Gilt statue on pedestal			Grade I	Q17528554	
More images	Charles II of England trampling Cromwell	Newby Hall, North Yorkshire	17th century, amended 18th century		Statue on pedestal	Marble with bronze and stone		Grade II	Q26577517	Relocated from London in 1883
More images	Statue of Viscount Combermere	Grosvenor Road, Chester	1865	Carlo Marochetti	Statue on pedestal	Bronze and granite	7.1m tall	Grade II*	Q15978984	
More images	Equestrian statue of Field Marshal Viscount Gough	Chillingham Castle, Northumberland	1878	John Henry Foley	Statue on pedestal	Bronze and stone				First erected in Dublin in 1878, re-located in 1988.
More images	Edward, the Black Prince	Leeds City Square	1903	Thomas Brock	Statue on pedestal	Bronze and granite		Grade II*	Q17533834	
More images	Newcastle & District War memorial	Old Eldon Square, Newcastle upon Tyne	1923	Charles Leonard Hartwell	Statue on pedestal	Bronze and stone		Grade II*	Q26409308	Cackett and Burns (architects).
More images	Harry Hotspur	Alnwick Castle, Northumberland			Statue on pedestal					

=== Southern England ===
Image	Title / subject	Location and coordinates	Date	Artist / designer	Type	Material	Dimensions	Designation	Wikidata	Notes
More images	King William III	The Square, Petersfield, Hampshire	18th-century, restored 1912		Statue on pedestal	Lead and stone		Grade I	Q17528308	
More images	King Charles II	Upper Ward, Windsor Castle, Berkshire	1679		Statue on pedestal	Bronze and stone			Q98270909	
More images	The Copper Horse, statue of King George III	Snow Hill, Windsor Great Park, Berkshire	1824-30	Richard Westmacott	Statue on pedestal	Bronze and stone		Grade I	Q7727584	
More images	Monument to Arthur Wellesley, 1st Duke of Wellington	Claycart Road, Aldershot	1846	Matthew Cotes Wyatt	Statue on pedestal	Bronze and stone	9.1m high	Grade II	Q7981504	Originally sited at Hyde Park Corner, London.
More images	Albert, Prince Consort	Windsor Great Park, Berkshire	1887	Joseph Edgar Boehm	Statue on pedestal	Bronze and granite		Grade II	Q26609381	
More images	Equestrian statue of Sir Redvers Buller	Hele Road, Exeter	1902	Adrian Jones	Statue on pedestal	Bronze and granite		Grade II	Q26558036	
More images	Equestrian statue of Edward Horner	Church of St Andrew, Mells, Somerset	1917	Alfred Munnings (sculptor), Sir Edwin Lutyens (architect)	Statue on cenotaph with battlefield cross	Bronze, stone and wood			Q29600659	
	Herbert Kitchener, 1st Earl Kitchener	Kitchener Barracks, Chatham, Kent	Relocated 1960		Statue on pedestal	Bronze and stone		Grade II	Q26558560	Statue originally stood in Khartoum, relocated to Chatham in 1960.
	Hyperion	High Street, Newmarket 52.24335°N 0.40461°E	1961	John Skeaping	Equestrian sculpture on pedestal	Bronze and stone	2.00 m high (sculpture)			Commissioned by John Stanley, 18th Earl of Derby. Sited in front of the Jockey Club Rooms.
More images	Emperor Nerva	Southgate Street, Gloucester	2002	Anthony Stones	Statue on pedestal	Bronze and stone				
More images	Equestrian statue of Elizabeth II, Windsor Great Park	Windsor Great Park	2003	Philip Jackson	Statue on pedestal	Bronze and stone			Q58339659	
More images	The Fine Lady	Banbury Cross, Banbury	2005	Andy Edwards, Carl Payne, Julian Jeffery (Artcycle Ltd.)	Statue on pedestal	Bronze and stone				
	The Queen's Statue	High Street, Newmarket 52°14′22.0″N 0°23′37.3″E	2016	Etienne Millner and Charlie Langton	Sculpture	Bronze, on plinth of Portland stone				Queen Elizabeth II, with mare and foal, is depicted in 1977, the year of her Silver Jubilee.

== Northern Ireland ==
Image	Title / subject	Location and coordinates	Date	Artist / designer	Type	Material	Dimensions	Designation	Wikidata	Notes
	William III	Orange Hall, Clifton Street, Belfast		Harry Hems	Statue on plinth	Bronze				

== Scotland ==
Image	Title / subject	Location and coordinates	Date	Artist / designer	Type	Material	Dimensions	Designation	Wikidata	Notes
	The Horse, 1514 Memorial	High Street, Hawick	1914	William Francis Beattie	Equestrian statue on pedestal	Bronze and stone		Category A	Q17571529	
More images	Border Reivers	Cornmill Square, Galashiels	1925	Thomas J Clapperton	Statue on pedestal and steps	Bronze and stone		Category B	Q17853847	
More images	Saint George	The Italian Chapel on Lamb Holm, Orkney	1943	Italian Prisoners of War	Statue on pedestal	Barbed wire covered in concrete				
More images	Statue of Robert the Bruce	Bannockburn	1964	Pilkington Jackson	Statue on pedestal	Bronze and granite		Category A		
More images	Robert The Bruce	Marischal College, Broad Street, Aberdeen	2011	Alan Beattie Herriot	Statue on pedestal	Bronze and stone				

=== Edinburgh ===
Image	Title / subject	Location and coordinates	Date	Artist / designer	Type	Material	Dimensions	Designation	Wikidata	Notes
More images	Charles II	Parliament Square, Edinburgh	1685		Statue on pedestal	Lead and stone		Category A	Q17570718	The pedestal is an 1835 replica of mason Robert Mylne's original.
More images	John Hope, 4th Earl of Hopetoun	Forecourt of the Royal Bank of Scotland, St Andrew Square, Edinburgh	1824-29	Thomas Campbell	Sculptural group on plinth	Bronze and granite		Category A	Q17570750	Designed in 1829 for Charlotte Square but erected in 1834 at Dundas House.
More images	Alexander the Great and Bucephalus	Courtyard of Edinburgh City Chambers, High Street	1832–83	John Steell	Sculpture group	Statue and pedestal		Category A	Q17570725	Modelled 1832, cast 1883.
More images	Arthur Wellesley, 1st Duke of Wellington	General Register House, Princes Street, Edinburgh	1848-52	John Steell	Statue on pedestal	Bronze and granite		Category A	Q17570765	Architects: David Bryce and James Gowans.
More images	Memorial to Albert, Prince Consort	Charlotte Square, Edinburgh	1862–76	John Steell	Statue on pedestal with other sculptures	Bronze and Peterhead granite		Category A	Q17570702	David Bryce (architect).
More images	Royal Scots Greys Memorial	West Princes Street Gardens	1906	William Birnie Rhind	Statue on pedestal	Bronze and stone		Category B	Q17813285	
More images	Douglas Haig, 1st Earl Haig	Hospital Square, Edinburgh Castle	1923	George Edward Wade	Statue on pedestal	Bronze and stone		Category B	Q17813234	
	Horse~Rider~Eagle	Silvermills, Edinburgh	1996	Eoghan Bridge	Equestrian statue	Bronze				

=== Glasgow ===
Image	Title / subject	Location and coordinates	Date	Artist / designer	Type	Material	Dimensions	Designation	Wikidata	Notes
More images	Statue of William II of Scotland	Cathedral Square, Glasgow	1735	Unknown	Equestrian statue on pedestal	Bronze and stone		Category A	Q17567391	
More images	Statue of Arthur Wellesley, 1st Duke of Wellington	Royal Exchange Square, Glasgow	1844	Carlo Marochetti	Equestrian statue on pedestal	Bronze and granite		Category A	Q7981506	
More images	Queen Victoria	George Square, Glasgow	1854	Carlo Marochetti	Equestrian statue on pedestal	Bronze and granite		Category A	Q17567473	First equestrian statue of a woman in Britain.
More images	Albert, Prince Consort	George Square, Glasgow	1866	Carlo Marochetti	Equestrian statue on pedestal	Bronze and granite		Category A	Q17567468	
	Saint George	St George's Cross, Glasgow	1897	Charles Blenkarn Grassby (sculptor), J & G Mossman (masons)	Statue on pedestal	Stone		Category C		
More images	Frederick Roberts, 1st Earl Roberts	Kelvingrove Park	1916	Henry Poole after Harry Bates	Equestrian statue on pedestal	Bronze and stone		Category A	Q17576740	
More images	Lobey Dosser	Woodlands Road, Glasgow	1992	Ranald MacColl (designer), Tony Morrow & Nick Gillion (sculptors)	Statue	Bronze				Statue of cartoon characters created by Bud Neill.

== Wales ==
Image	Title / subject	Location and coordinates	Date	Artist / designer	Type	Material	Dimensions	Designation	Wikidata	Notes
More images	Godfrey Morgan, 1st Viscount Tredegar	Cathays Park, Cardiff	1909	William Goscombe John	Statue on pedestal	Bronze and stone		Grade II	Q29491649	
More images	The Two Kings	Harlech, Gwynedd	1984	Ivor Roberts-Jones	Statue	Bronze				Figures represent Bran the Blessed and Gwern from the Mabinogion.
More images	Owain Glyndŵr	The Square, Corwen, Denbighshire	2007	Colin Spofforth	Statue on pedestal	Bronze and granite	4.5m high			

== Channel Islands ==
Image	Title / subject	Location and coordinates	Date	Artist / designer	Type	Material	Dimensions	Designation	Wikidata	Notes
	Sir Hugh Calveley (The Perfect Knight)	Middle Ward of Mont Orgueil Castle, Gorey, Jersey			Statue	Bronze				
