= Wellington Arch =

Triumphal arch in London

Coordinates: 51°30′9″N 0°9′3″W

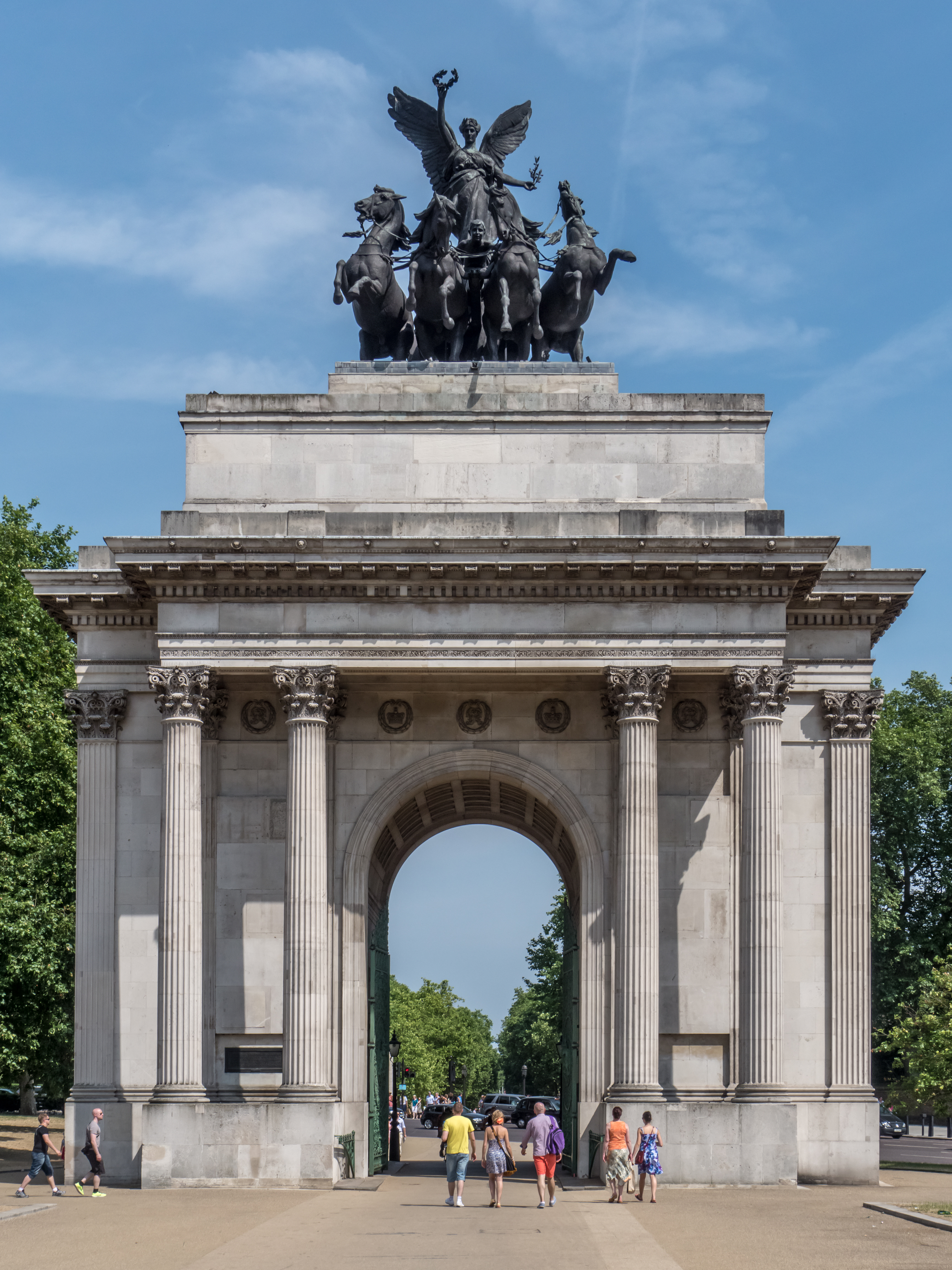
The Wellington Arch in 2013

The Wellington Arch, also known as the Constitution Arch or (originally) as the Green Park Arch, is a Grade I listed triumphal arch by Decimus Burton that forms a centrepiece of Hyde Park Corner in central London, the road junction near the south-eastern corner of Hyde Park. The arch stands on a large green-space traffic island with crossings for pedestrian access. A ceremonial byway running between Hyde Park and Constitution Hill still passes under the arch and may be used for official processions.

The arch was built between 1826 and 1830 directly opposite Burton's Ionic Screen as part of a majestic approach route from Hyde Park to Buckingham Palace. In 1882–1883, it was taken down and rebuilt a short distance away, facing west, at its current site at the top of Constitution Hill.

As a result of a moratorium on expenditure from 1828, all the intended sculpture was omitted from the arch when it was built. A public subscription was raised in 1837 for an equestrian statue of the 1st Duke of Wellington, to be placed on the arch. In 1846, over the vehement objections of Burton, a colossal equestrian statue by the sculptor Matthew Cotes Wyatt was installed on the arch, leading to the name by which the arch is known.

When the arch was moved a short distance and rebuilt in 1882-83, Matthew Cotes Wyatt's colossal statue was not reinstated. It was held in storage in London until 1885, when it was sent to Aldershot and re-erected. Since 1912, the sculpture Peace descending on the Quadriga of War by Adrian Jones, a bronze of the Goddess of Victory Nike riding a quadriga (an ancient four-horse chariot), has surmounted the arch.

== Construction ==
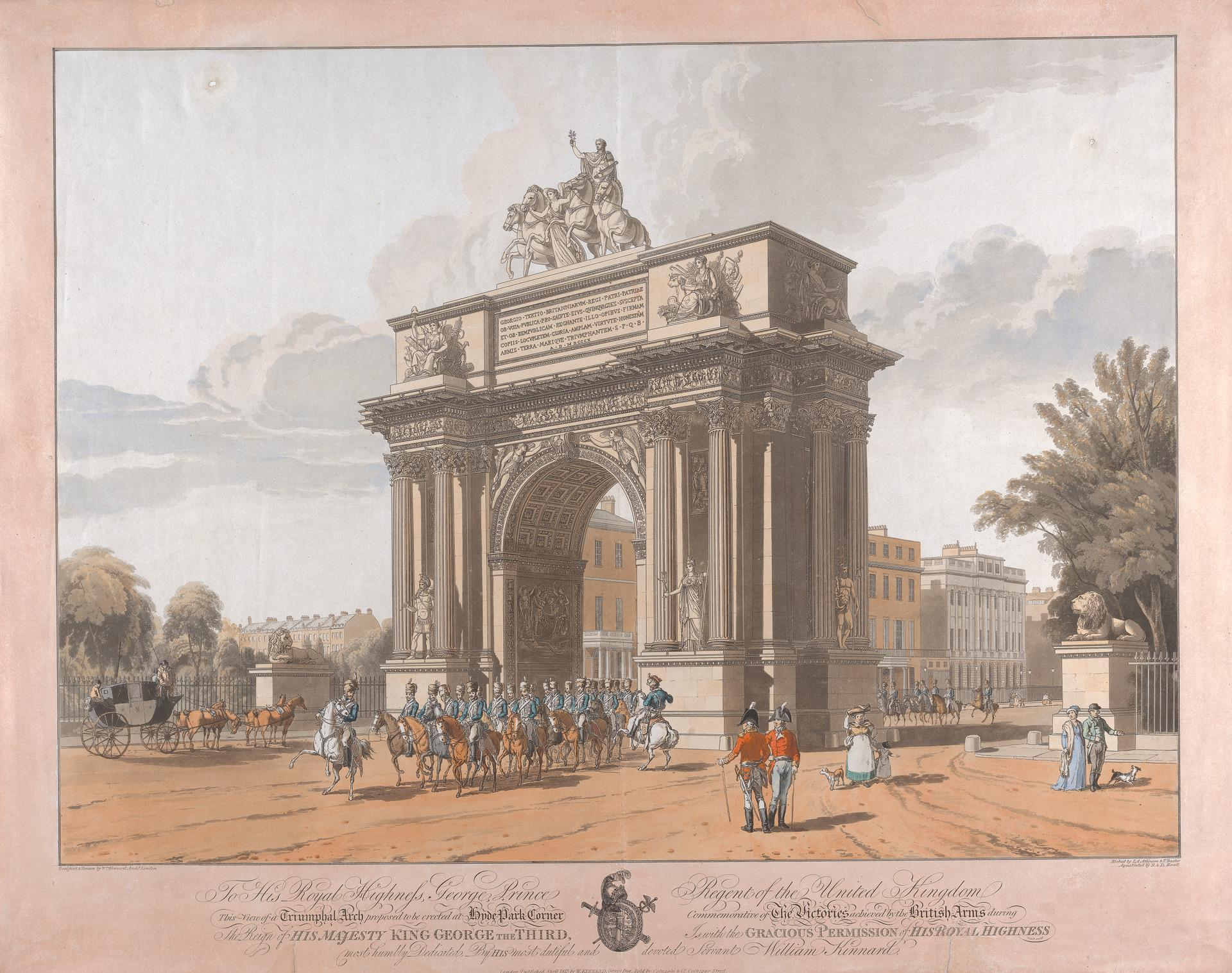
1813 proposal by William Kinnard for a triumphal arch across Piccadilly at Hyde Park Corner. Apsley House can be seen through the arch.

Even before the Battle of Waterloo had been fought, proposals were being made for a triumphal arch at Hyde Park Corner. One, by the architect William Kinnard, was remarkably similar to the final form which the Wellington Arch was to reach 100 years later (except that George III was atop the quadriga rather than Nike).

Both the Wellington Arch and Marble Arch (originally sited in front of Buckingham Palace) were planned in 1825 by George IV to commemorate Britain's victories in the Napoleonic Wars. During the second half of the 1820s, the Commissioners of Woods and Forests and the King resolved that Hyde Park, and the area around it, should be renovated to match the splendour of rival European capital cities, and that the essence of the new arrangement would be a triumphal approach to the recently completed Buckingham Palace.

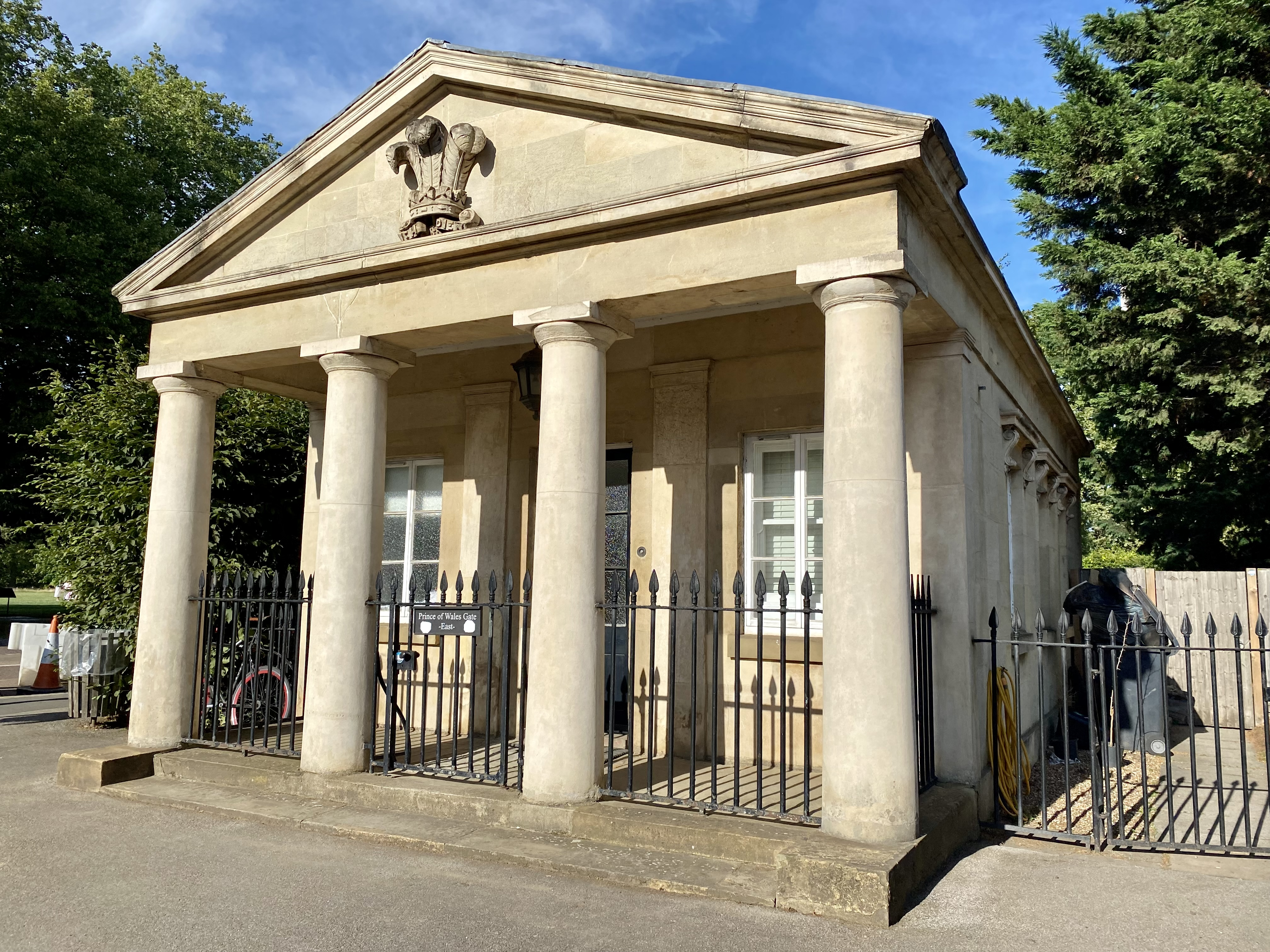
East lodge to Prince of Wales's Gate, Hyde Park, 2023

The committee of the project, led by the Prime Minister, Lord Liverpool, and advised by Charles Arbuthnot, President of the Board of Commissioners of Woods and Forests, selected Decimus Burton as the project's architect. In 1828, when giving evidence to a Parliamentary Select Committee on the Government's spending on public works, Arbuthnot explained that he had nominated Burton "having seen in the Regent's Park, and elsewhere, works which pleased my eye, from their architectural beauty and correctness". Burton intended to create an urban space dedicated to the celebration of the House of Hanover, national pride, and the nation's heroes. The renovation of Hyde Park, Green Park, and St James's Park began in 1825, with the demarcation of new drives and pathways, subsequent to which Burton designed new lodges and gates in the classical style, viz. Cumberland Gate, Stanhope Gate, Grosvenor Gate, the Ionic Screen at Hyde Park Corner and, later, the Prince of Wales's Gate, Knightsbridge. There were no authoritative precedents in the classical style for such buildings, which required windows and chimney stacks. In the opinion of architectural historian Guy Williams, "Burton's reticent treatment of the supernumerary features" and of the cast iron gates and railings was "greatly admired".

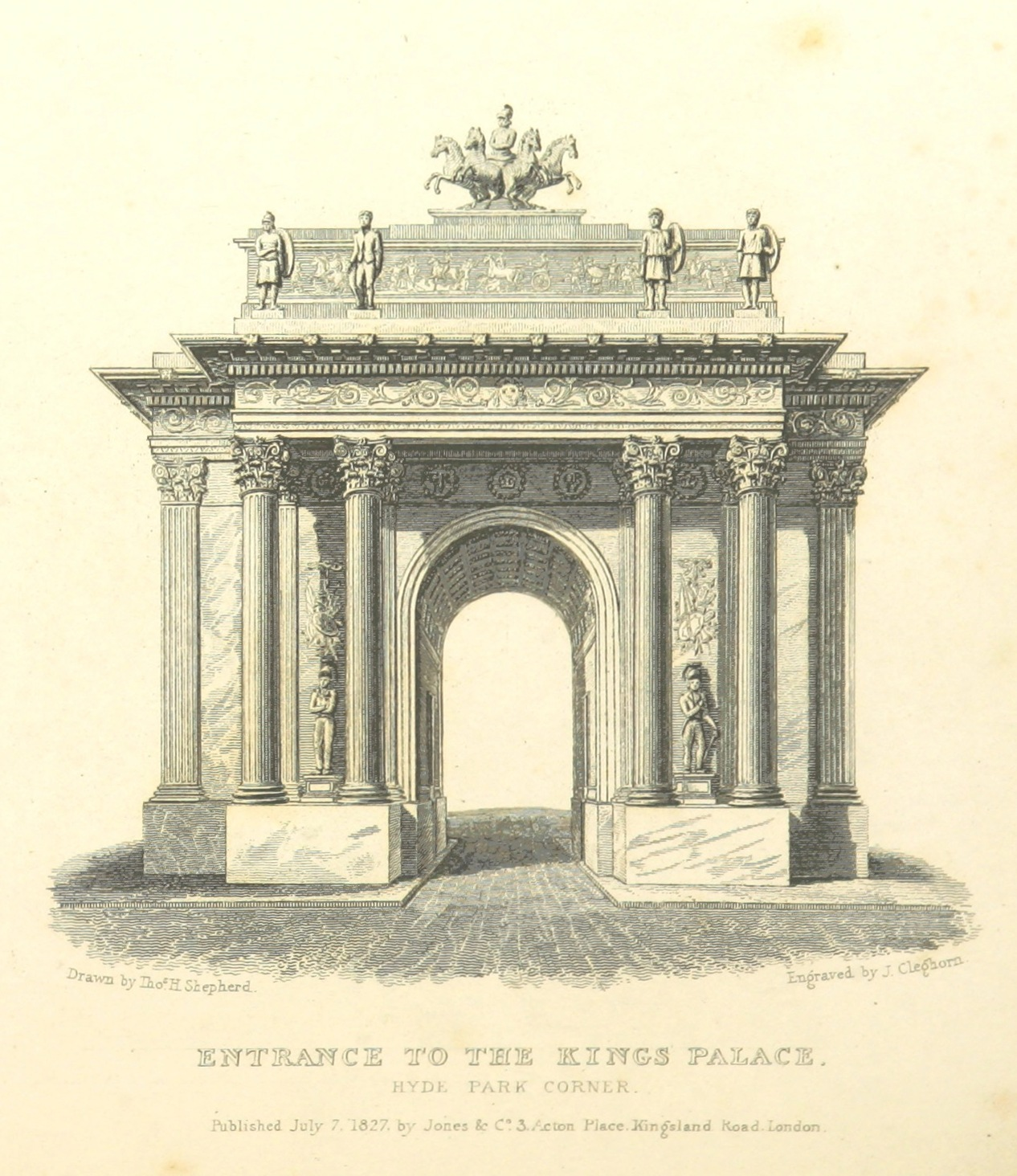
1827 engraving showing the full ornamentation originally intended for the arch, including reliefs and statues. The engraving, from Thomas H. Shepherd's Metropolitan Improvements, was published while the arch was still under construction.

At Hyde Park Corner, the King required "some great ceremonial outwork that would be worthy of the new palace that lay to its rear". He accepted Burton's proposal for a gateway, a classical screen and a triumphal arch. Those approaching Buckingham Palace from the north would pass first through the screen, then through the arch, before turning left to descend Constitution Hill and enter the forecourt of Buckingham Palace through John Nash's Marble Arch.

The screen became the neoclassical Ionic Screen at Hyde Park Corner, which delighted the King and his Committee, and which Guy Williams describes as "one of the most pleasing architectural works that have survived from the neo-classical age". The triumphal arch became the Wellington Arch, originally immediately opposite the Ionic Screen as the entrance to Green Park but now at the western end of the road down Constitution Hill; it has been described as "one of London's best loved landmarks".

Burton's original design for the triumphal arch was modelled on the Arch of Titus at Rome, the source for the central and side blocks of the Ionic Screen. It therefore cohered perfectly with the Screen, but was rejected by the Committee because it was not sufficiently ostentatious. Burton created a new design, "to pander to the majestic ego". This was much larger and modelled on a fragment found in the Roman Forum. It was accepted on 14 January 1826, and subsequently became the present Wellington Arch.

The arch has a single opening, and uses the Corinthian order. Overspending on Buckingham Palace led to a moratorium in 1828 on public building work, with the consequence that most of the intended exterior ornamentation and all the decorative sculpture was omitted. The original plans are shown in the 1827 engraving at the start of this section.

== Sculpture of the triumphal arch ==
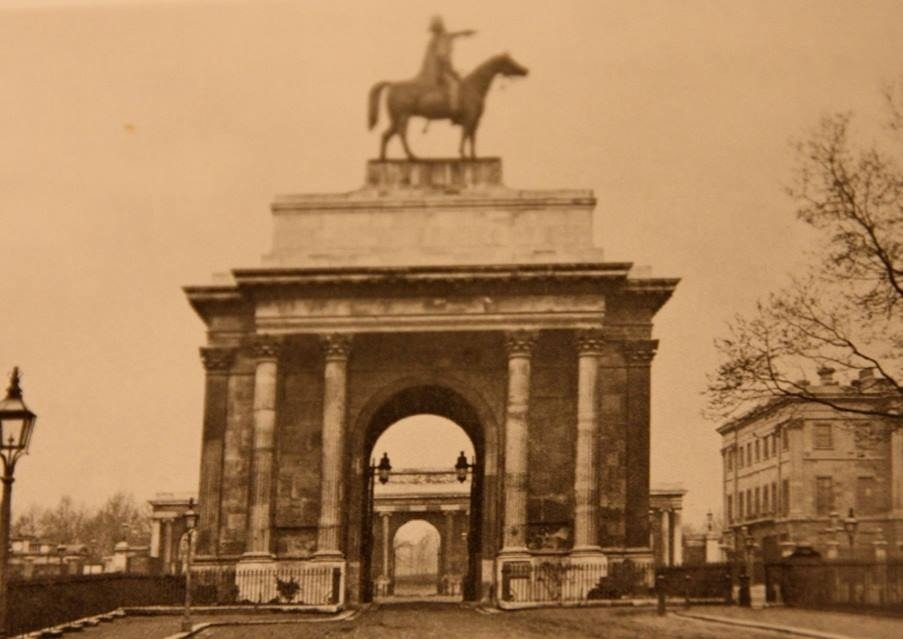
The Wellington Statue on the Arch in the 1850s. The arch faced the central arch of the Ionic Screen, which formed the entrance to Hyde Park. Apsley House is visible to the right.

When it was built, the arch was left without decorative sculpture. In 1837 a public subscription was raised for an equestrian statue of Arthur Wellesley, 1st Duke of Wellington, to be placed on top of the arch. The organiser was Sir Frederick Trench, with his patron John Manners, 5th Duke of Rutland. They selected as sculptor Matthew Cotes Wyatt, of whom F. M. O'Donoghue wrote in the Dictionary of National Biography "thanks to royal and other influential patronage, Wyatt enjoyed a reputation and practice to which his mediocre abilities hardly entitled him".

Burton repeatedly expressed his opposition to the proposal "as plainly and as vehemently as his nature allowed" over subsequent years. The statue would "disfigure" his arch, for which it was much too large. Contrary to all classical precedent, it would have to be placed across, instead of in line with, the roadway under the arch.

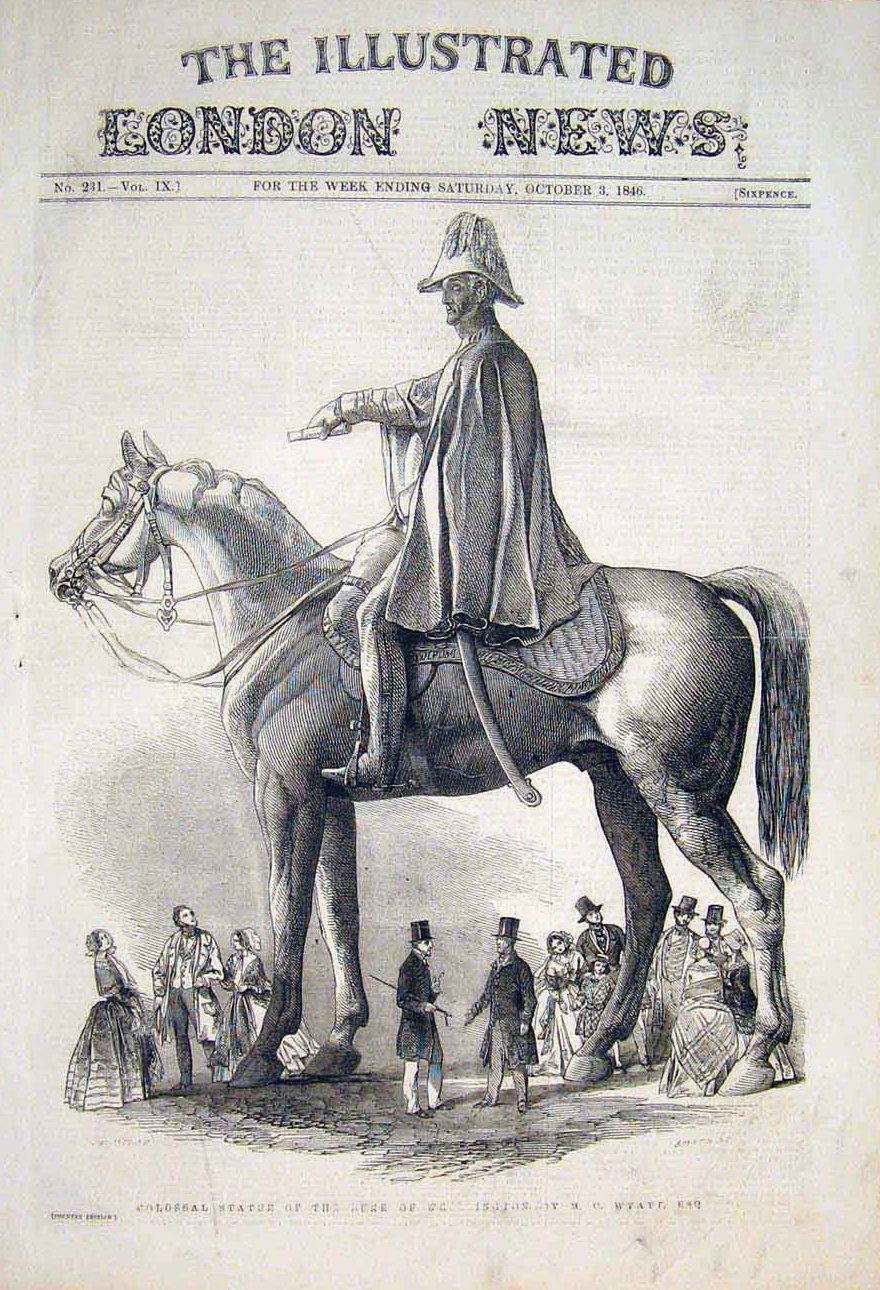
Wellington Statue 1846

The objection was not just to the principle of an equestrian statue across the arch rather than a quadriga aligned with it. It was to the size of the statue. It was to be a colossal equestrian statue, 28 feet high and weighing 40 tons, the largest equestrian figure ever made.

Burton's objections were endorsed by most of the aristocratic residents of London. A writer in The Builder asked Lord Canning, the First Commissioner for Woods and Forests, to ban the project:

We have learnt, and can state positively, that Mr. Burton has the strongest objection possible against placing the group in question on the archway... and that he is taking no part whatever in the alteration proposed to be made in the upper part of the structure to prepare it to receive the pedestal... Mr. Burton, through the mildness which characterizes him, has not expressed this opinion so loudly and so publicly as he ought to have done.... an opinion prevails very generally, that he is a party to the proceedings, and this has induced many to be silent who would otherwise have spoken...

The Prime Minister, Sir Robert Peel, contended that another site would be preferable, and proposed, on behalf of the Crown, to offer any other site. The statue's subscribers rejected all alternative proposals. Every single MP except Sir Frederick Trench wanted the statue to be placed elsewhere.

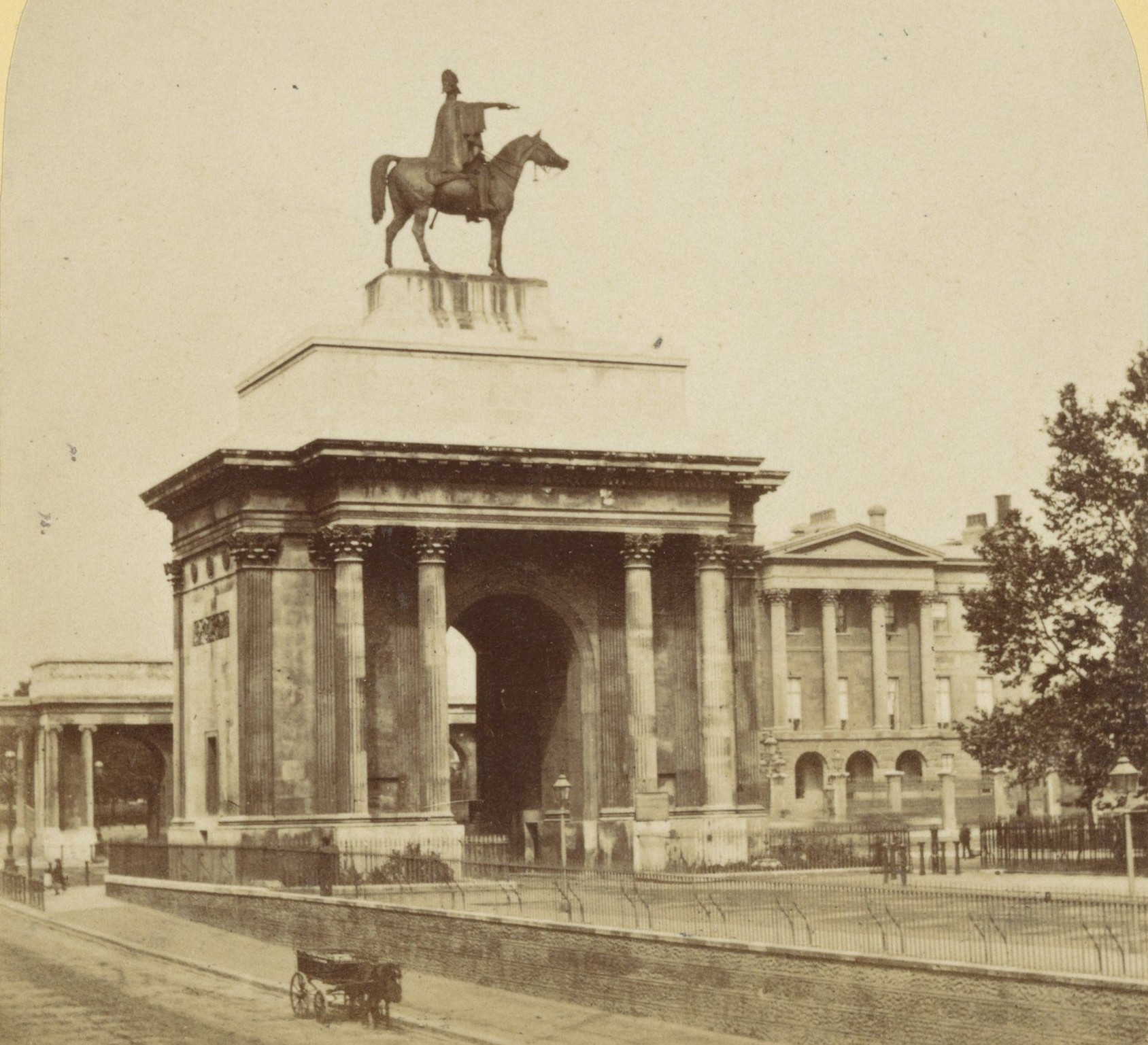
View from the south of Wellington Arch surmounted by Matthew Cotes Wyatt's Equestrian Statue of Wellington

Decimus Burton wrote, "The arch would, I consider, suffer greatly in importance if the colossal statue in question be placed there, because it would become a mere pedestal. The want of proportion in the proposed surmount, compared with the columns and other details of the architecture, would show that they had been designed by different hands, and without reference for each other... I would prefer that the building should remain for the present in its forlorn and bare state, rather than a colossal equestrian statue should be placed upon it... In 1846 the Government placed the Wellington statue on the arch. The Builder contended, "down, unquestionably, it must come. As the network of timber is removed, spar by spar, from before it, so do the folly of the experiment, the absurdity of the conjunction, and the greatness of the sacrifice become apparent. Its effect is even worse than we anticipated – the destruction of the arch by the statue, and of the statue by its elevation on the arch, more complete. Every post brings us letters urging renewed efforts to remove the figure to another site". Arguments about removal of the statue became national.

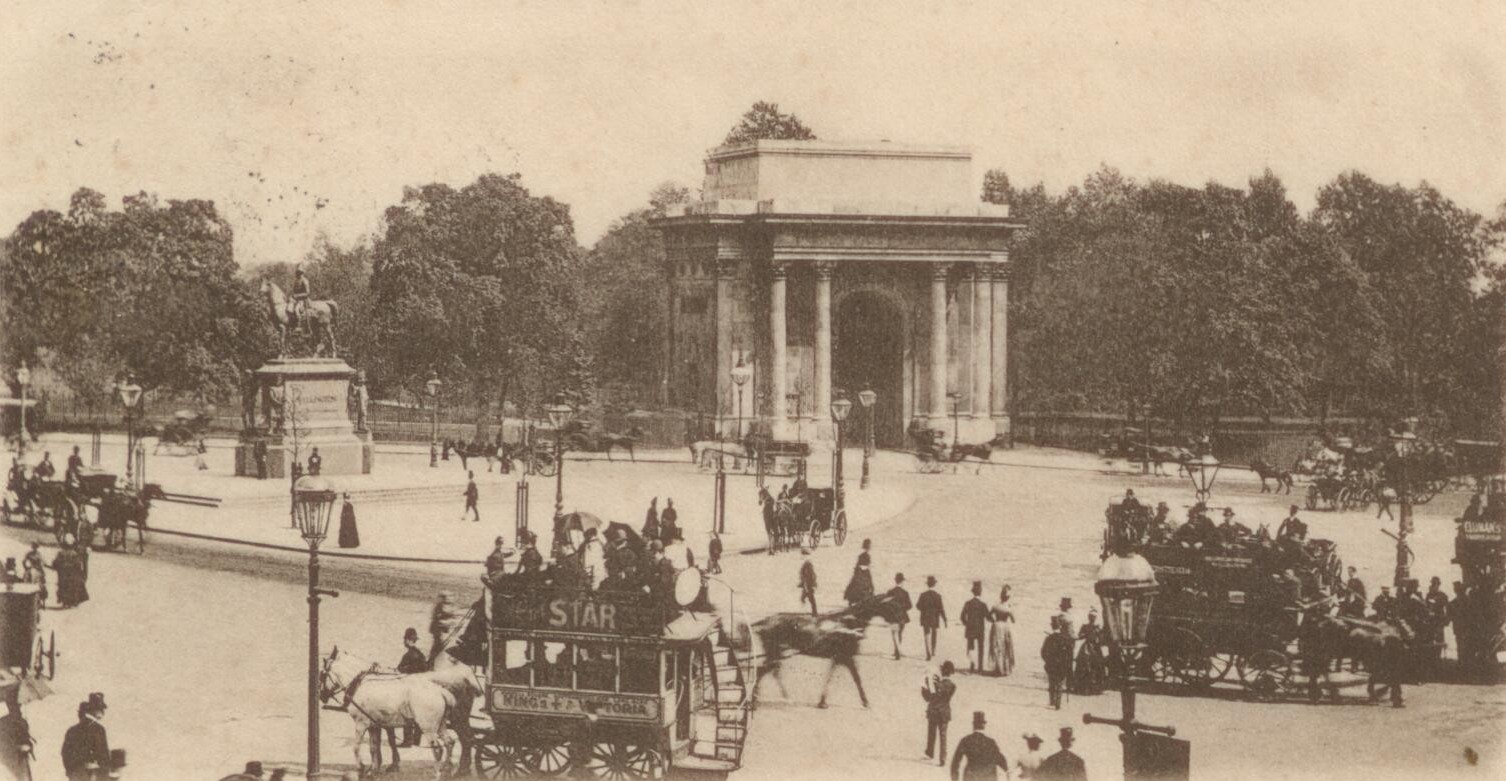
The Arch and Boehm's Wellington Statue at Hyde Park Corner from the Ionic Screen, 1900

When it was placed, the Government had said that they would remove the statue if it provoked strong aversion. However, they failed to remove it. Wellington was then in his late 70s; he died in 1852. In the early 1880s, traffic congestion at Hyde Park Corner (which was then a T-junction) led to demands for the junction to be enlarged. As both roads at the junction were hemmed in on one side by the arch, it would have to be taken down and rebuilt at another location. The proposed new layout put the arch at the top of Constitution Hill, creating space for a large triangular junction.

Burton's great-nephew Francis Fearon compiled and published a pamphlet that advocated that if the arch was moved, Wellington's statue should not go with it: the arch should be "relieved once and for all of its unsightly load". The campaign led by Fearon was successful: when the arch was taken down and rebuilt in 1882-1883, Wyatt's statue was put into storage. It was moved to Aldershot in 1885 and re-erected.

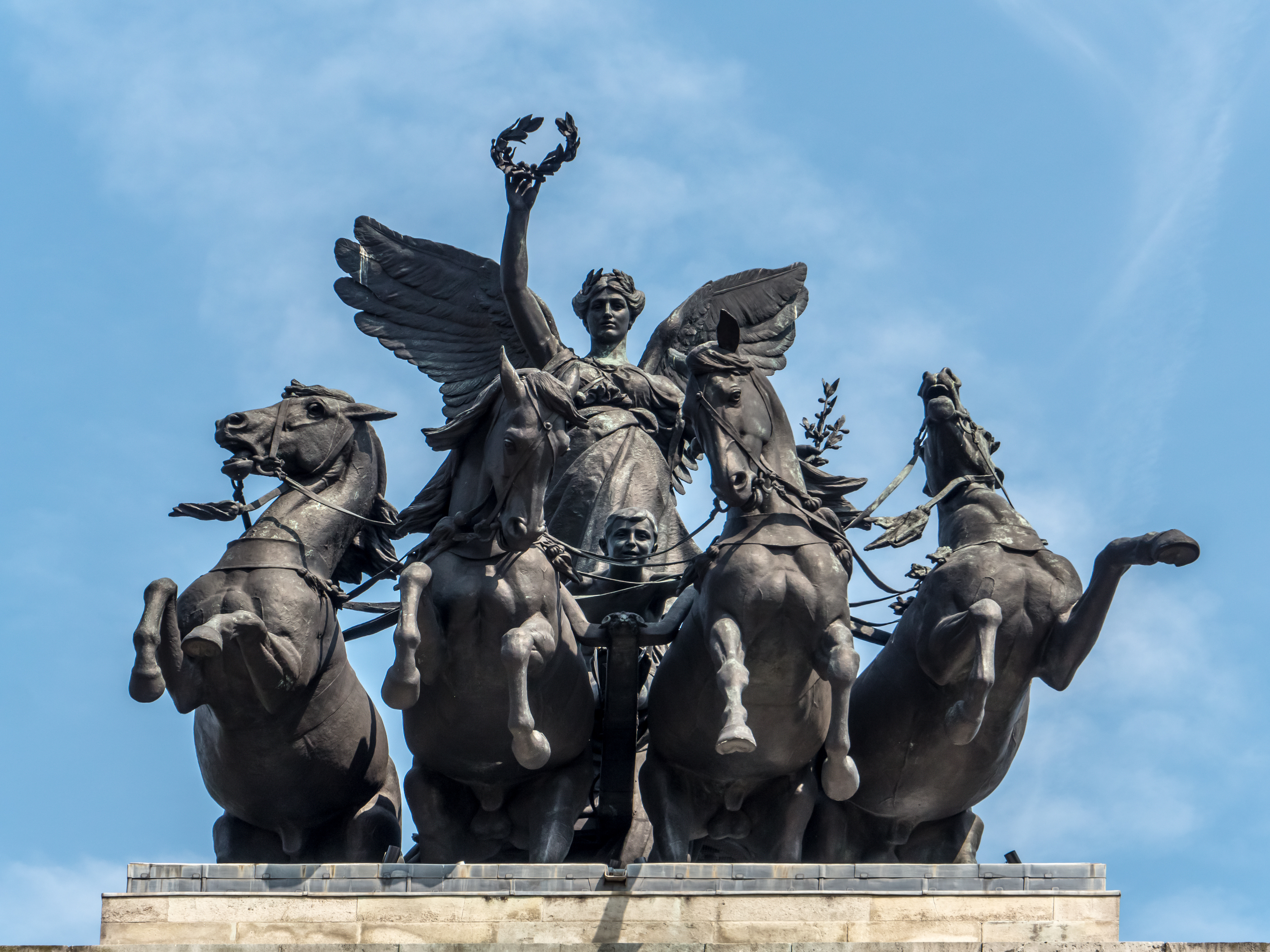
Peace descending on the Quadriga of War by Adrian Jones

Burton's arch remained bare for 30 years. In 1913 the sculpture Peace descending on the Quadriga of War by Adrian Jones was placed on it. Its figures, unlike those of Wyatt's statue, are aligned with the roadway under the arch.

Jones's statue is based on a smaller original which caught the eye of Edward VII at a Royal Academy exhibition. The sculpture depicts Nike, the winged goddess of victory, descending on the chariot of war, holding the classical symbol of victory and honour, a laurel wreath. The face of the charioteer leading the quadriga is that of a small boy (actually the son of Lord Michelham, who funded the sculpture). The angel of peace was modelled on Beatrice Stewart. The statue is the largest bronze sculpture in Europe.

== Public access ==
The arch is hollow inside and until 1992 housed the smallest police station in London. Transferred to the ownership of English Heritage in 1999, it is open to the paying public: three floors of exhibits detailing the history of the arch, Exhibition space, and high terraces on both sides of the arch with views of the surrounding area. One half of the arch functions as a ventilation shaft for the Hyde Park Corner road underpass, constructed in 1961–1962.

== See also ==
- Equestrian statue of the Duke of Wellington, Aldershot
