= Equestrian statue of Elizabeth II, Windsor Great Park =

Equestrian statue of Elizabeth II
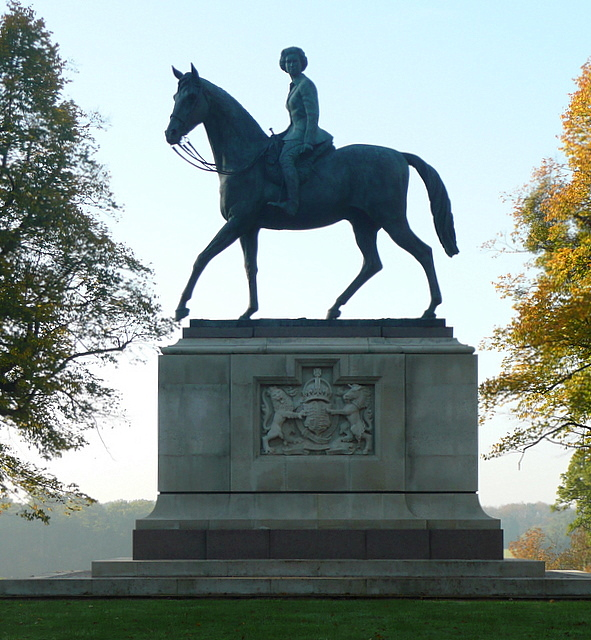
- The statue in 2011
- Location: Windsor Great Park
- Coordinates: 51°26′9.5″N 0°37′39.3″W
- Designer: Philip Jackson
- Dedicated to: Elizabeth II

An equestrian statue of Elizabeth II stands in Windsor Great Park near Windsor, Berkshire. The statue, designed by the sculptor Philip Jackson, was commissioned by the Crown Estate in honour of the queen's Golden Jubilee. The monument was dedicated in 2003.

== History ==
The statue was commissioned by the Crown Estate for the Golden Jubilee of Elizabeth II. The sculptor Philip Jackson was selected to design the equestrian statue. It was dedicated on 27 October 2003 and is notable for being the first public statue of Elizabeth II in the United Kingdom. As part of the dedication, the statue was blessed by Canon John Ovenden.

== Design ==
The statue is approximately 1.5 times life-size and is located at the highest point of Queen Anne's Ride in the park. Elizabeth II is depicted as she would have looked in the 1970s, while the horse is intentionally not modelled after any specific horse.

== See also ==
- List of equestrian statues in the United Kingdom
