= South African War Memorial (South Australia) =

Equestrian war memorial in Adelaide, Australia

- Adelaide City Council
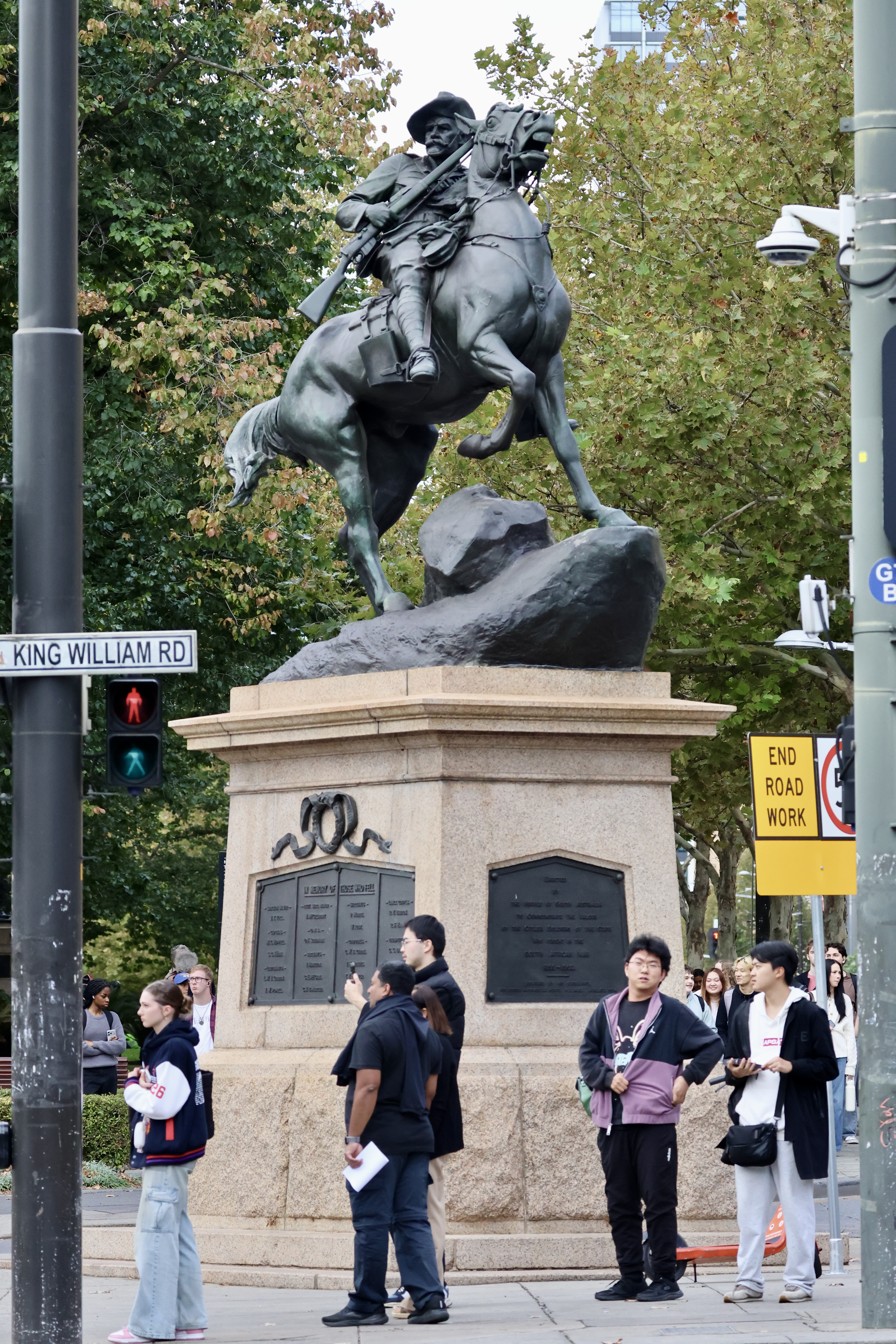
- For the citizen soldiers of the state who fought in the South African War
- Unveiled: 6 June 1904
- Location: 34°55′17.45″S 138°35′58.06″E; Adelaide
- Designed by: Adrian Jones (Sculpture), Garlick, Sibley and Wooldridge (Pedestal)

South Australian Heritage Register
- Official name: South African (Boer) War Memorial
- Designated: 28 May 1987
- Reference no.: 13349

The South African War Memorial (also known as the Boer War Memorial or, prior to 1931, the National War Memorial) is an equestrian memorial dedicated to the South Australians who served in the Second Boer War of 11 October 1899 to 31 May 1902. It was the first war in which South Australians fought, and 1,531 men were sent in nine contingents, with over 1,500 horses to accompany them. Over 59 South Australians died in the war.

The memorial is located in front of the main entrance to Government House, one of the most prominent buildings in Adelaide, on the corner of North Terrace and King William Road. It was constructed with a budget of £2,500 raised through public donations, and was designed by the London-based sculptor Adrian Jones. While the statue itself was not intended to represent any particular soldier, there is evidence suggesting that the head of the rider was based on that of George Henry Goodall.

The statue was unveiled by the Governor of South Australia, George Le Hunte, on 6 June 1904. It has since become one of the focal points for the Anzac Day marches, as well as being regarded as one of the most "eye-catching" and significant statues in the city. As such, it was added to the national heritage listing in 1990.

== Background ==
In 1899, the Orange Free State and Transvaal declared war on Britain. South Australia, "fiercely" loyal to the British Empire and still "two years away from federation", joined the other Australian colonies in sending troops to support the Empire in the conflict. With the support of Adelaide's newspapers, nine contingents of South Australian troops were sent to the war during the three years of hostilities, totalling 1,531 men and 1,507 horses. Funding for the endeavour was garnered through the State and Imperial Governments in combination with funds raised through public subscriptions. In addition to the formal contingents, a number of Australians served as colonial troops, either having paid their way to Southern Africa after the conflict had begun or having already been present in the region prior to the outbreak of hostilities. By the time hostilities ended on 31 May 1902, at least 59 South Australians had been killed in the war.

== Design and construction ==
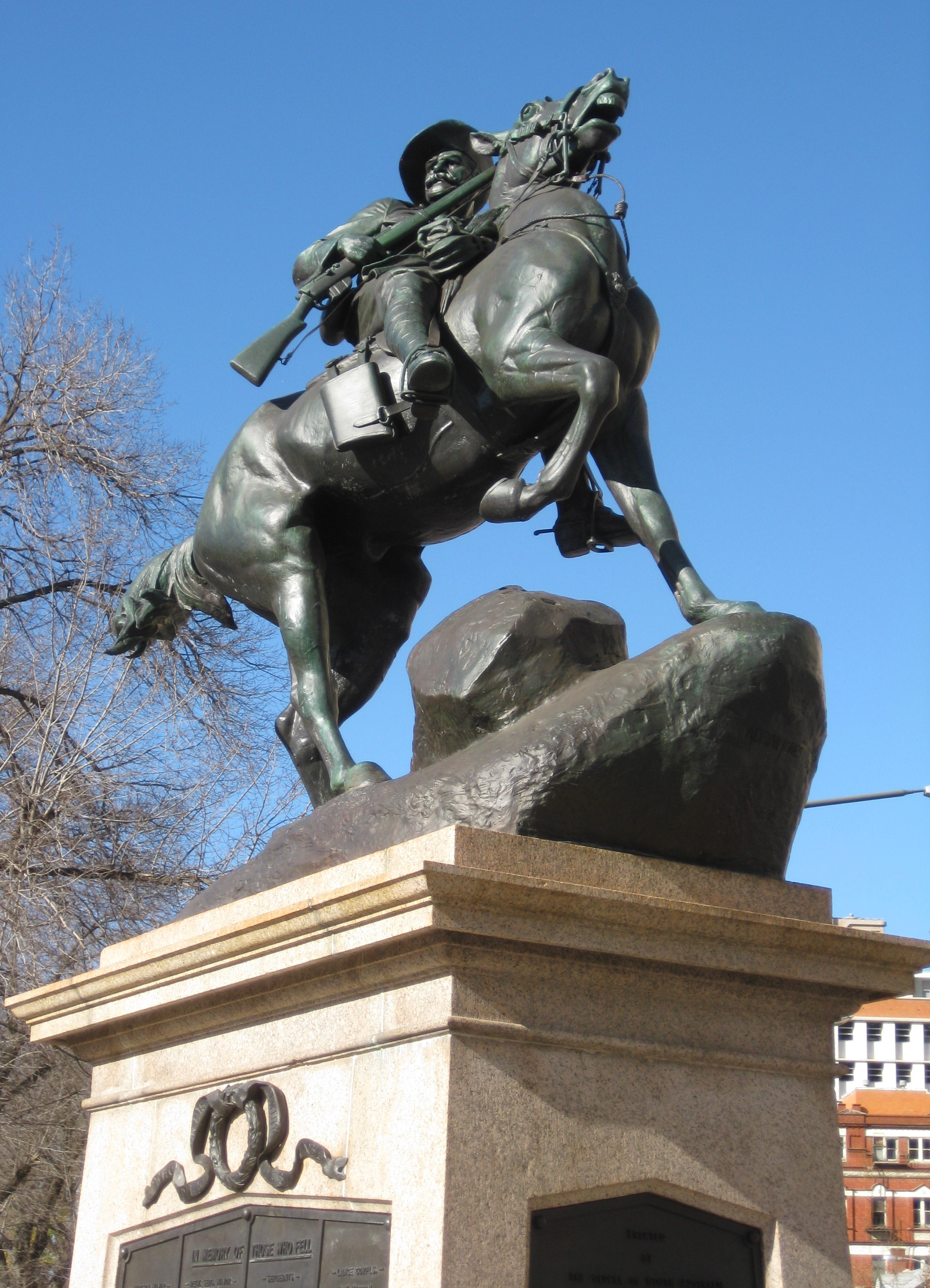
View of the statue after the 2007 restoration was complete.

A committee to build a memorial to those who served and died in the Second Boer War was formed shortly after the war was ended, spurred by a suggestion in July 1901 by J. Johnson to erect an equestrian statue. Chaired by George Brookman, the committee rapidly raised £2,500 from public donations. With the assistance of the Agent-General, Henry Allerdale Grainger, a subcommittee consisting of members who were present in London at the time was engaged to find a sculptor who would be able to provide the statue that they desired. The original intent of the committee was to purchase a secondhand statue and to make alterations to suit. Nevertheless, the Agent-General recommended Captain Adrian Jones, a veterinarian, military officer and sculptor who had an "affinity for animals", and who had previously worked on equestrian projects. Jones made two offers to the committee: the first was to construct a replica of a work that he had entered into a South African competition, on the condition that it would be cast only if the original was accepted; while the second was to model a smaller work based on a sketch he had produced. The second option he priced at £1600, arguing that the reduced cost was acceptable as it would allow him to keep his staff in employment until the larger South African commission was finalized. The committee were quite taken by his sketch, agreeing to the second option and looking no further.

Finding that he needed advice in regard to accoutrements and the attitude of Australian soldiers, Jones made inquiries about consulting with an Australian. George Henry Goodall, a South Australian veteran of the Second Boer War, was at the time serving as Regimental Quartermaster Sergeant with the Australian Corps engaged in London at the coronation ceremonies for King Edward VII. Goodall was "volunteered" to attend Jones in order to model and to provide advice. Goodall later described how Jones had requested that he pose while the sculptor created a clay model of his head, but Simon Cameron observed that Jones's memoirs "do not mention any sittings." Nevertheless, a 1940 memorandum, based on a conversation with Goodall, noted that "a comparison of a photograph of Mr Goodall, taken in 1902 with the statue itself certainly indicates a strong facial likeness". In the same memorandum it was noted that Goodall only posed for the head, and that he insisted that his selection to model for the statue was not based on any outstanding merit as a soldier.

With the choice of statues settled, a competition was run in Adelaide in 1903 to find the design for the pedestal. A total of 12 entries were received, with the submission by Garlick, Sibley and Wooldridge (the firm consisting of only Henry Evan Sibley (1867–1917) and Charles W. Wooldridge at that point (Note: The firm also designed the pedestal for the statue of William Light in 1904, Unley Town Hall, some of the Hackney tram barn buildings, the Scarfe Cottage Homes in Gertrude St, Norwood and many smaller projects.)) being selected as the winner. The pedestal is 12 feet in height, and was constructed from granite quarried from the nearby town of Murray Bridge.

The bronze plaques which are mounted on the sides of the pedestal list the names of 59 South Australians who died in the conflict, and were cast from gun plates by A. W. Dobbie and Company. (A. W. Dobbie and Company were later responsible for the bronze castings on the South Australian National War Memorial to those who served in World War I). A further 16 South Australians died in relation to the Boer War, while an additional four died either during training or upon their return. Also missing from the list is Harry "Breaker" Morant, who had served in the second contingent of troops to be sent from South Australia, and was executed by the British after being found guilty by court martial of the murder of unarmed Boer troops. There was no controversy at the time in regard to his omission, although the decision not to include his companion Peter Handcock (who was executed alongside Morant) on the Bathurst, New South Wales, memorial was more problematic, and was rescinded in 1964.

The memorial is located in front of Government House on the corner of North Terrace and King William Road, one of the busiest corners in the city.

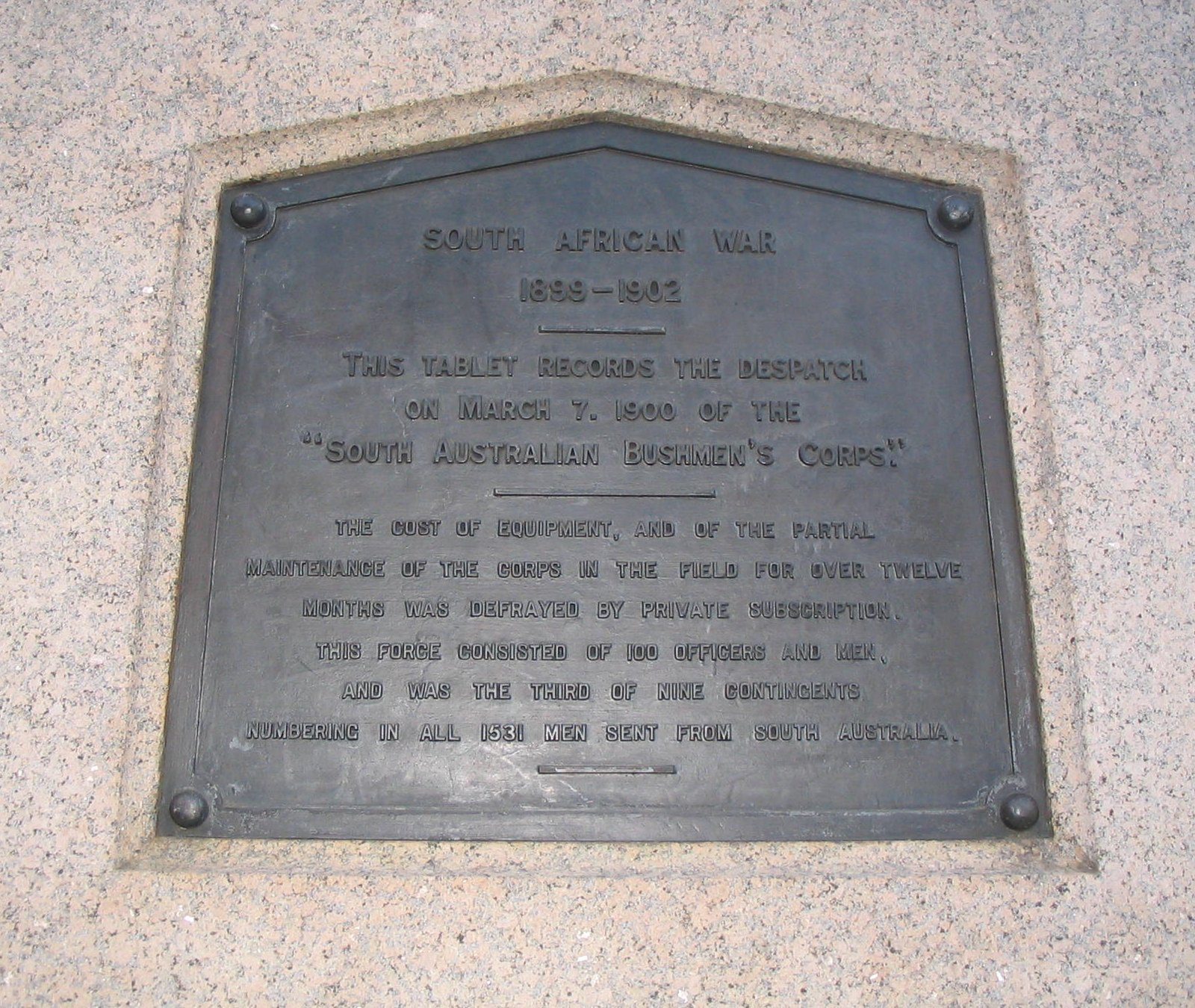

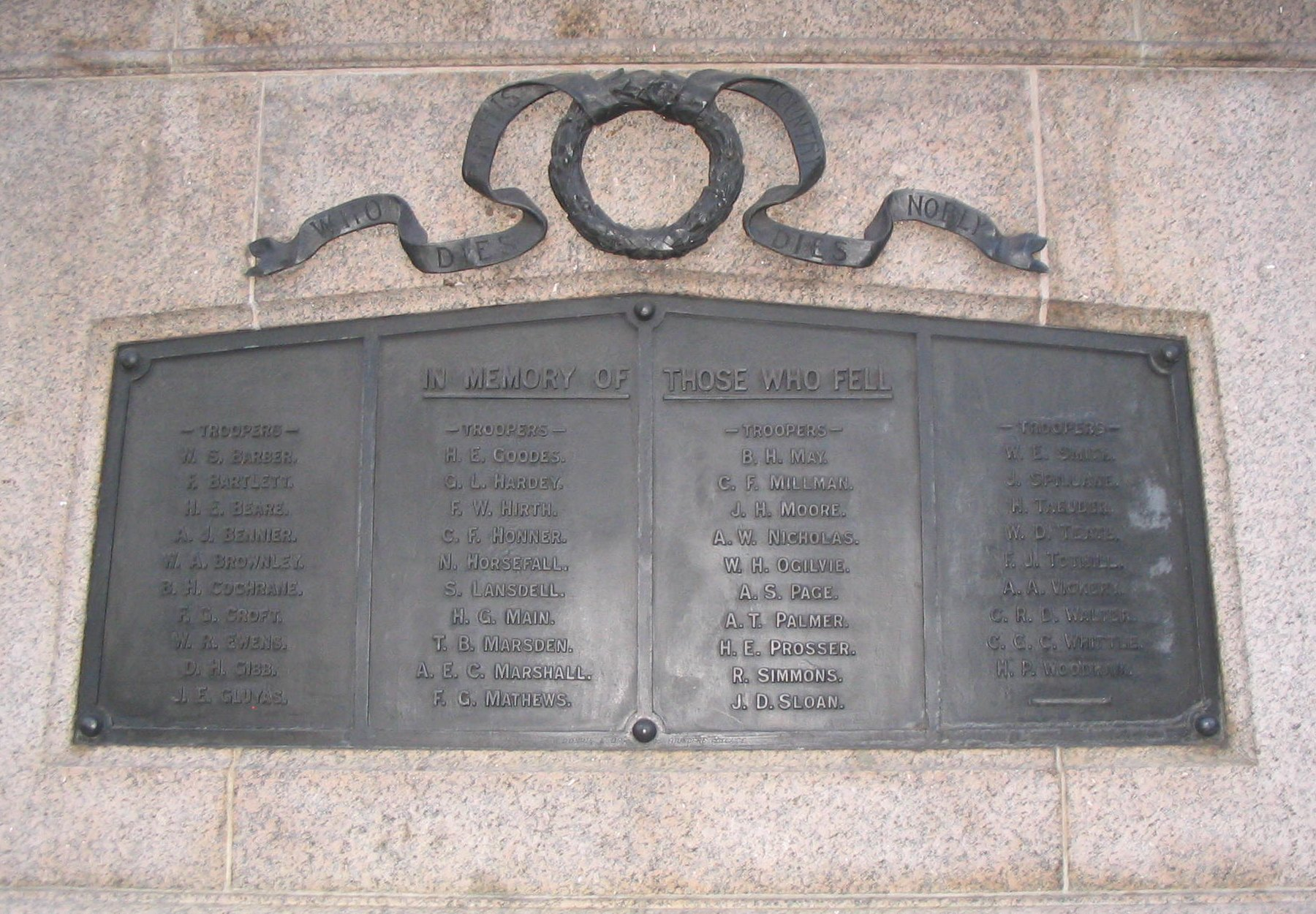

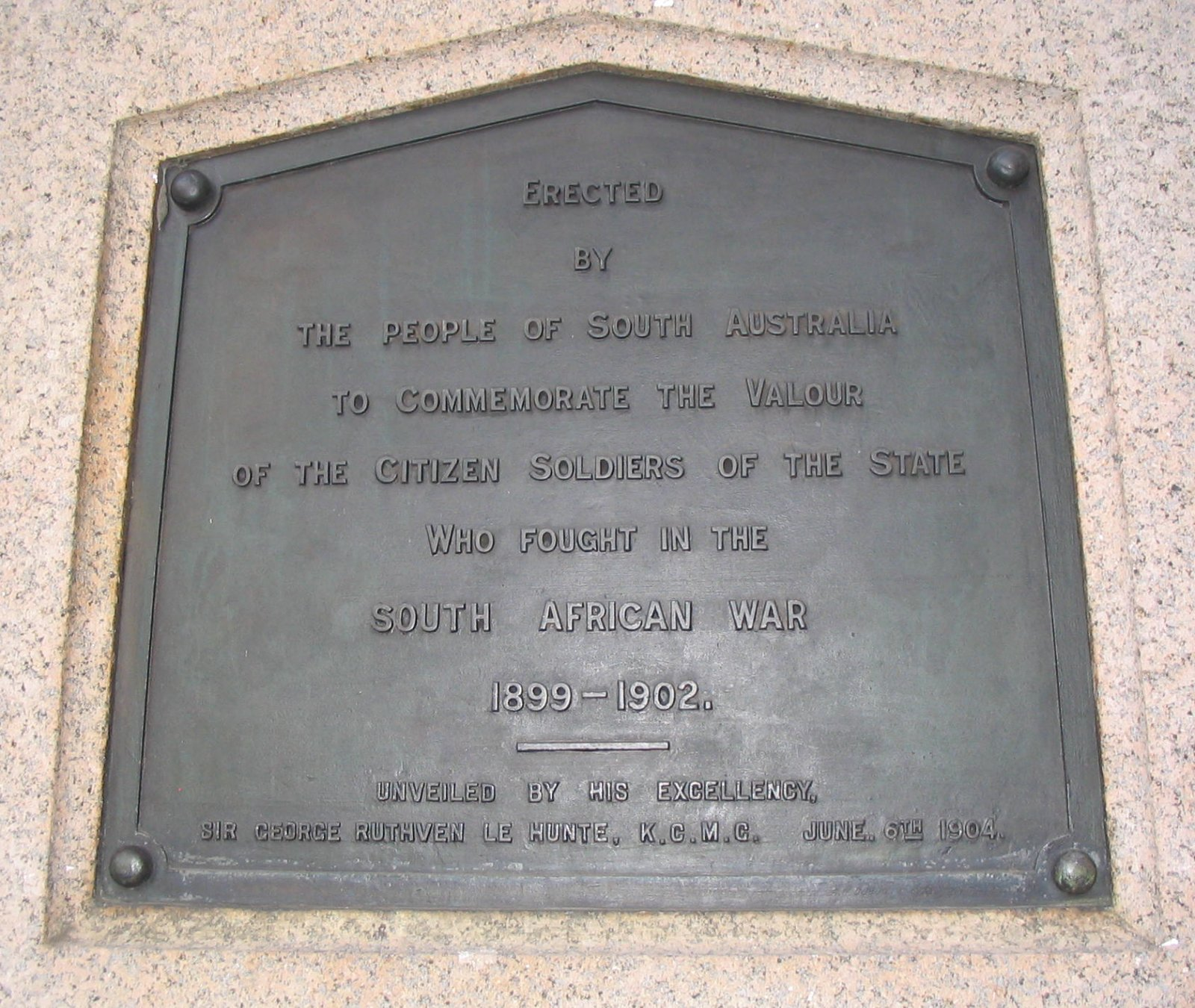

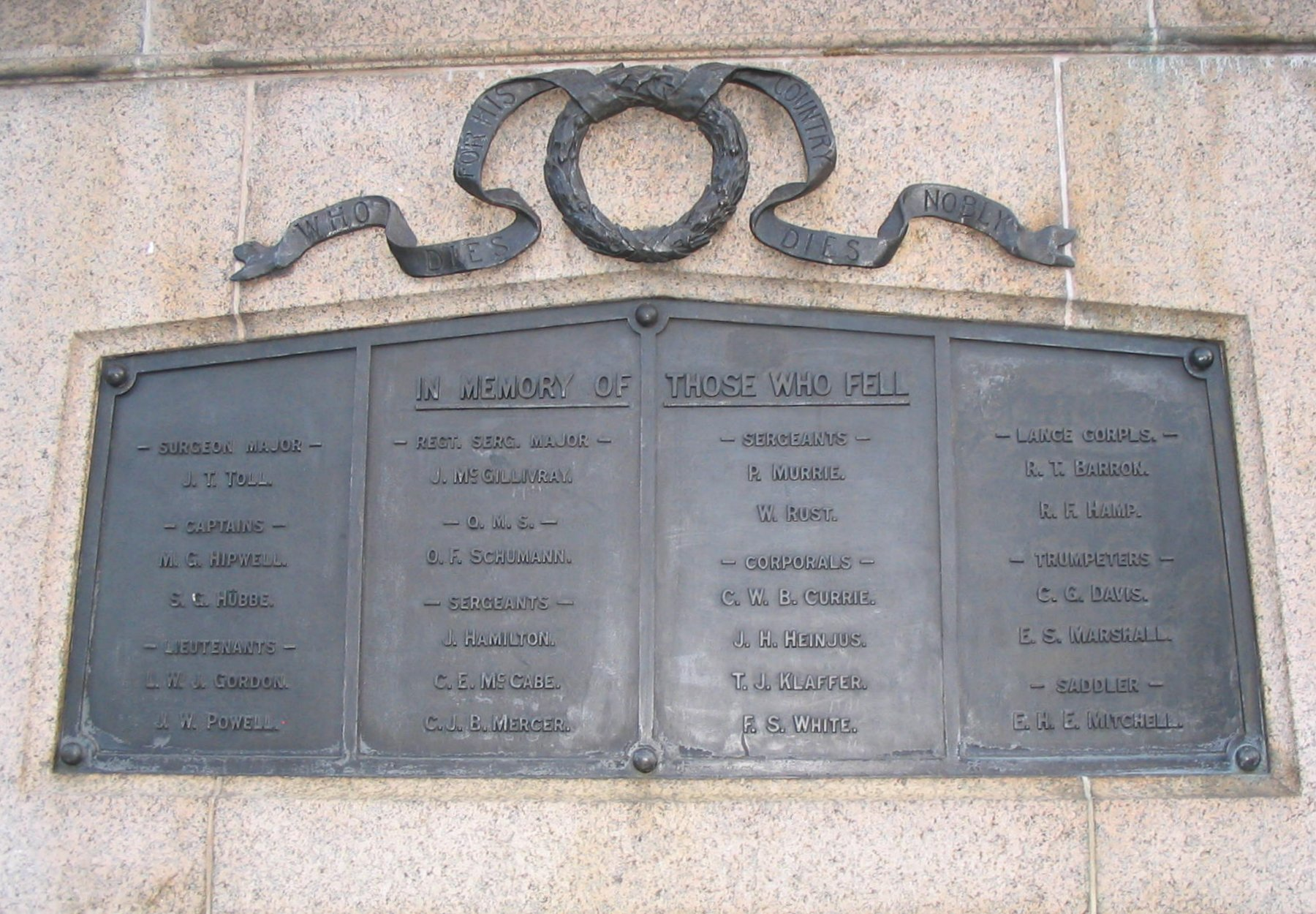

== Unveiling ==
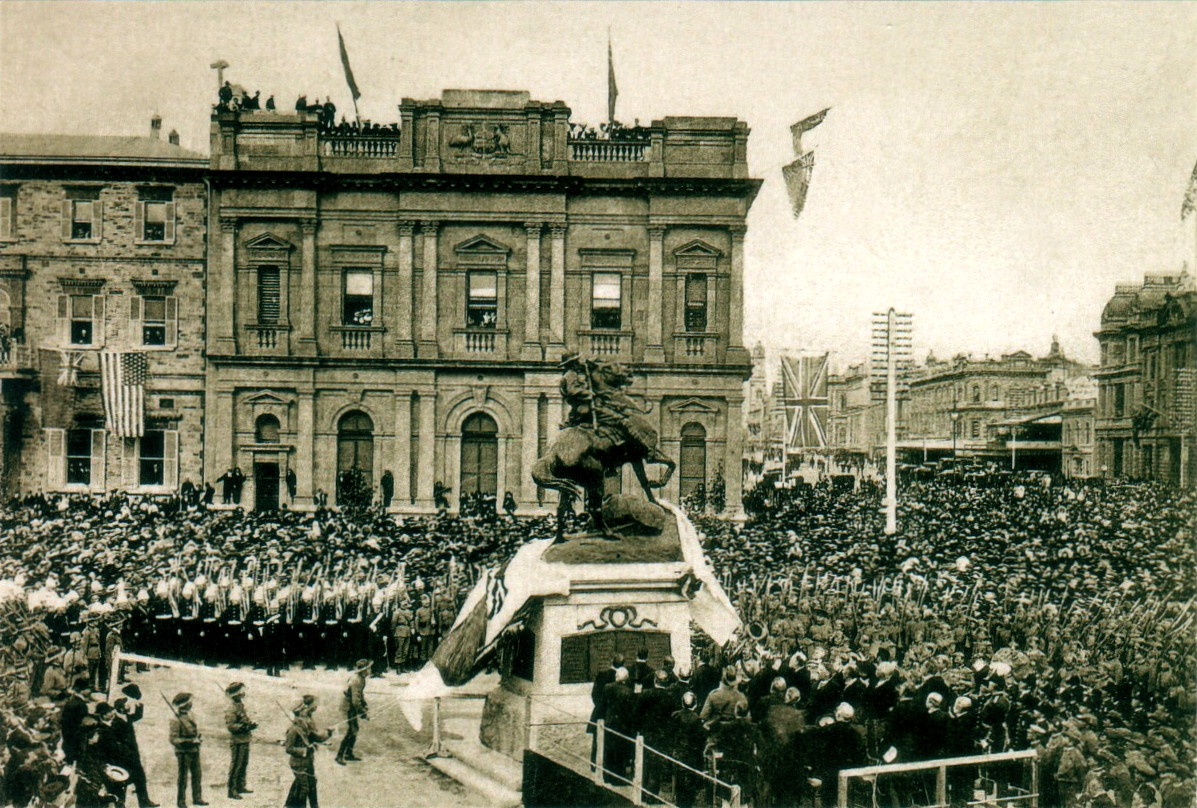
The unveiling of the memorial (6 June 1904).

The memorial was unveiled on 6 June 1904. This date was significant both as the birthday of the then Prince of Wales, and the third anniversary of the Battle of Graspan, (in which South Australian soldiers had served). A large crowd gathered to view the unveiling, and the speakers included the chair of the memorial committee, George Brookman, and Sir George Le Hunte, the Governor of South Australia. The memorial itself was shrouded by canvas and the Union Jack, which fell away to reveal the statue underneath.

At the time of the unveiling the memorial was referred to as the South Australian "National War Memorial", but the name was later changed to the South African War Memorial after the 1931 completion of a new memorial on the corner of Kintore Avenue and North Terrace, which was built to remember those who served in the First World War.

When it was unveiled, the South African War Memorial was one of only two public equestrian sculptures in the country (the other being a depiction of Saint George and the Dragon at the National Gallery of Victoria), and the only commemorative equestrian work.

== Reception ==
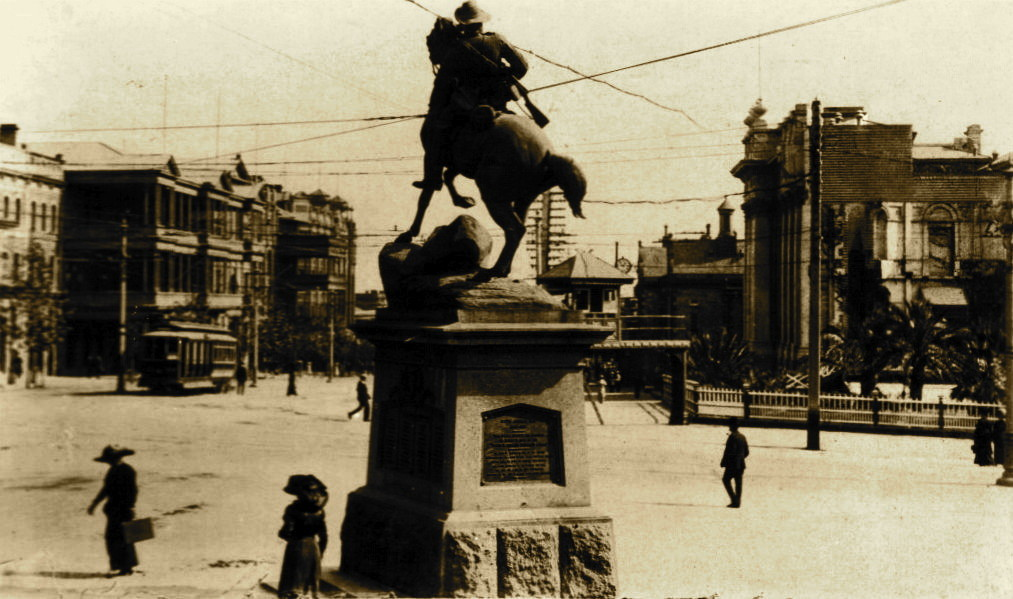
The memorial circa 1925, looking west along North Terrace.

The memorial has been well received from the outset. When shown sketches the design, one of the Adelaide contingent described it as "spirited" – a word that was echoed by King Edward VII upon being shown a photograph of the model that was produced. When the completed statue arrived in Adelaide in 1904, the committee was reportedly delighted, and many in Australia viewed it as the best statue in the country.

In more recent times, Ken Inglis has described the work as the "apotheosis" of the bushman soldier, representing the bushman and the horse at war (the "Australian centaur"), and noted that it was possible to view the memorial as commemorating "dead horses as well as dead men". Simon Cameron, in his work "Silent Witness: Adelaide's statues and monuments", described the memorial as the most eye-catching statue in Adelaide, a view that was echoed by Chris Brice in 1999. More generally, the memorial is regarded as one of "Adelaide's most significant statues". The statue received national heritage listing in 1990, having been described both as a "significant landmark" and an "important piece of public sculpture of its period."

== The memorial today ==
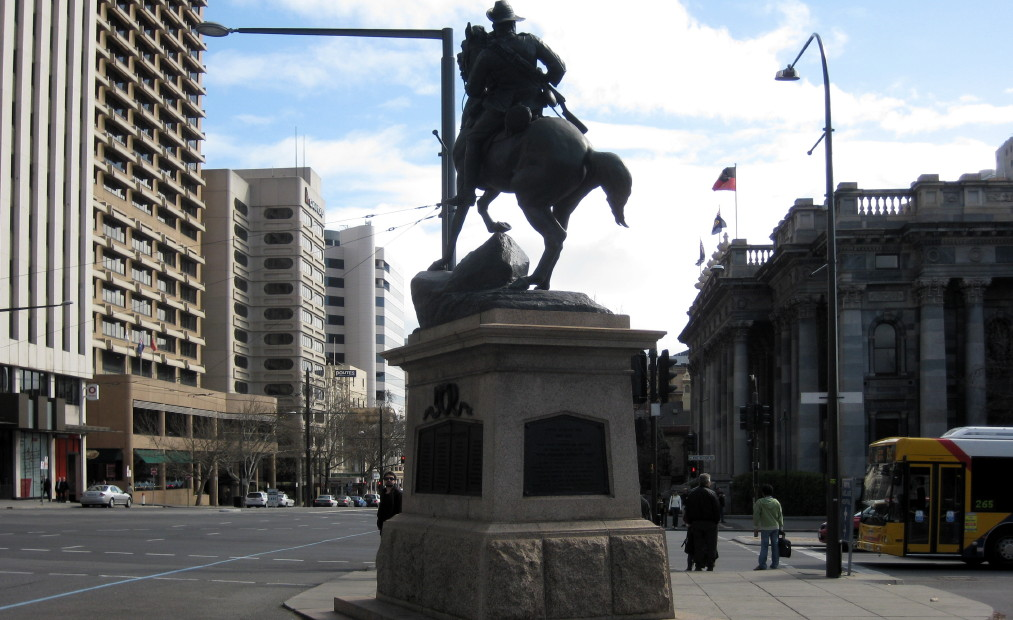
The memorial circa 2008, looking west along North Terrace.

After World War I the memorial became one of the centerpieces of the Adelaide Anzac Day march. The route for the march starts at the National War Memorial, heads west along North Terrace, and turns right down King William Road before culminating in a service at the Cross of Sacrifice (in the Adelaide Park Lands opposite the St Peter's Cathedral). As the marchers turn on to King William Road they salute the South African War Memorial.

As part of the State of South Australia's sesqui-centenerary in 1986, referred to locally as "Jubilee 150", a "Jubilee 150 Walkway" was created along the north side of North Terrace, commencing at the memorial. A commemoration ceremony for the memorial was held on the 100th anniversary of its dedication, 6 June 2004, with the Governor Marjorie Jackson-Nelson in attendance.

The memorial's location on a busy street corner has caused it to deteriorate, resulting in at least two recent clean-up and restoration projects. The first involved a clean-up of the granite base, while the second involved more extensive restoration, and was completed in April 2007 at a cost of $90,000.

In recent years there has been talk of building a replica of the memorial. On 31 May 2008 on Anzac Parade, Canberra, the formal dedication of a site in which will be placed a new national Boer War memorial was held. A National Boer War Memorial Committee was formed prior to that date, and they will be conducting a national competition to find a design for the new memorial. In the design brief for the memorial, the committee state that it is their desire to build a memorial along the same lines as Adelaide's: going so far as to say that they would be willing to accept a replica of the statue from the South Australian memorial if the original mould could be located or if a duplicate could otherwise be produced.
