= Royal Marines Memorial =

War memorial in London

- United Kingdom
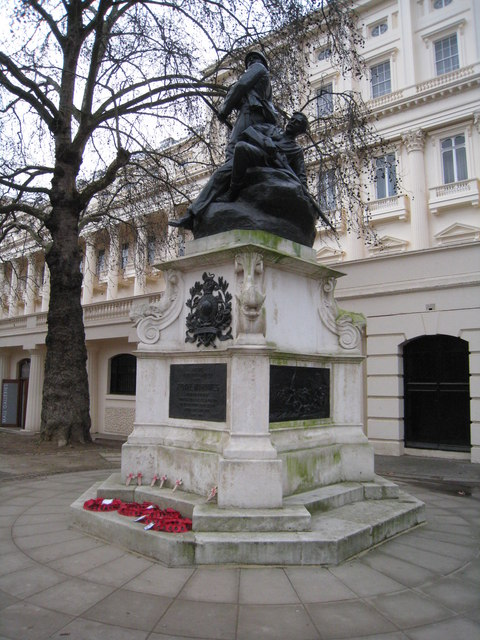
- The memorial in 2010
- For Royal Marines who died in the Boxer Rebellion and Second Boer War
- Established: 1903
- Location: 51.506538°N 0.129532°W; The Mall, London
- Designed by: Adrian Jones

The Royal Marines Memorial, also known as the Graspan Royal Marines Memorial, is an outdoor bronze sculpture by Adrian Jones, installed on the north side of The Mall in London, United Kingdom. Located next to Admiralty Arch, the 1903 memorial commemorates the Royal Marines who died in the Boxer Rebellion in China and the Second Boer War in Africa, and depicts two figures on a Portland stone plinth. It is named after the Battle of Graspan, in which the Royal Marines participated.

== Description ==
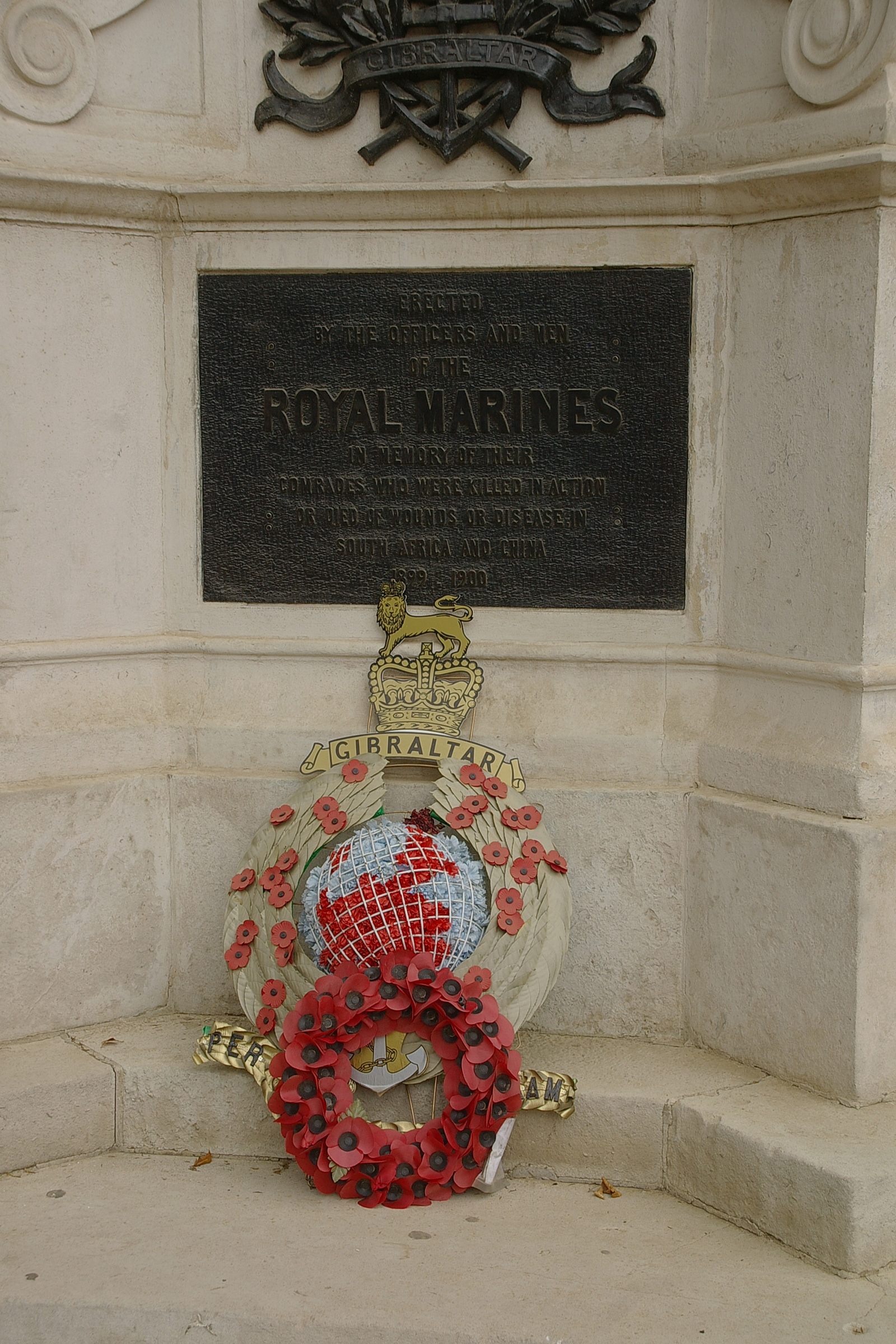
The monument in 2009

The memorial features two bronze figures on a Portland stone plinth. Brass lettering laid in the ground around it reads: "This memorial was rededicated in October 2000 in honour of all Royal Marines who have served their country by land and sea and who are forever remembered by their friends." The base includes bronze plaques by Sir Thomas Graham Jackson depicting the conflicts and Roll of Honour of the two conflicts.

A brass plaque on the front of the plinth contains the inscription, "Erected by the officers and men of the Royal Marines in memory of their comrades who were killed in action or died of wounds or disease in South Africa and China, 1899–1900." Bronze reliefs on the plinth's sides depict the Repulse of the Chinese attack on the Peking legation and the conflict at Graspan. One side contains the inscription, "Adrian Jones 1902"; the other side may contain the same inscription, but the text is much less legible. A brass plaque on the plinth's back displays the names of 70 men who died in either conflict.

== History ==
In 1940, it was put in storage during construction of The Citadel. It was relocated to its present position in 1948. In 2000 the sculpture was rededicated as the national monument for the Royal Marines. It was unveiled by the Duke of Edinburgh, the Captain General of the Marines. The memorial became the focus of the annual Graspan Parade and is maintained by The Royal Parks.

== See also ==
- 1903 in art
