= Cavalry of the Empire Memorial =

War memorial in Hyde Park, London

Coordinates: 51°30′17″N 0°09′19″W

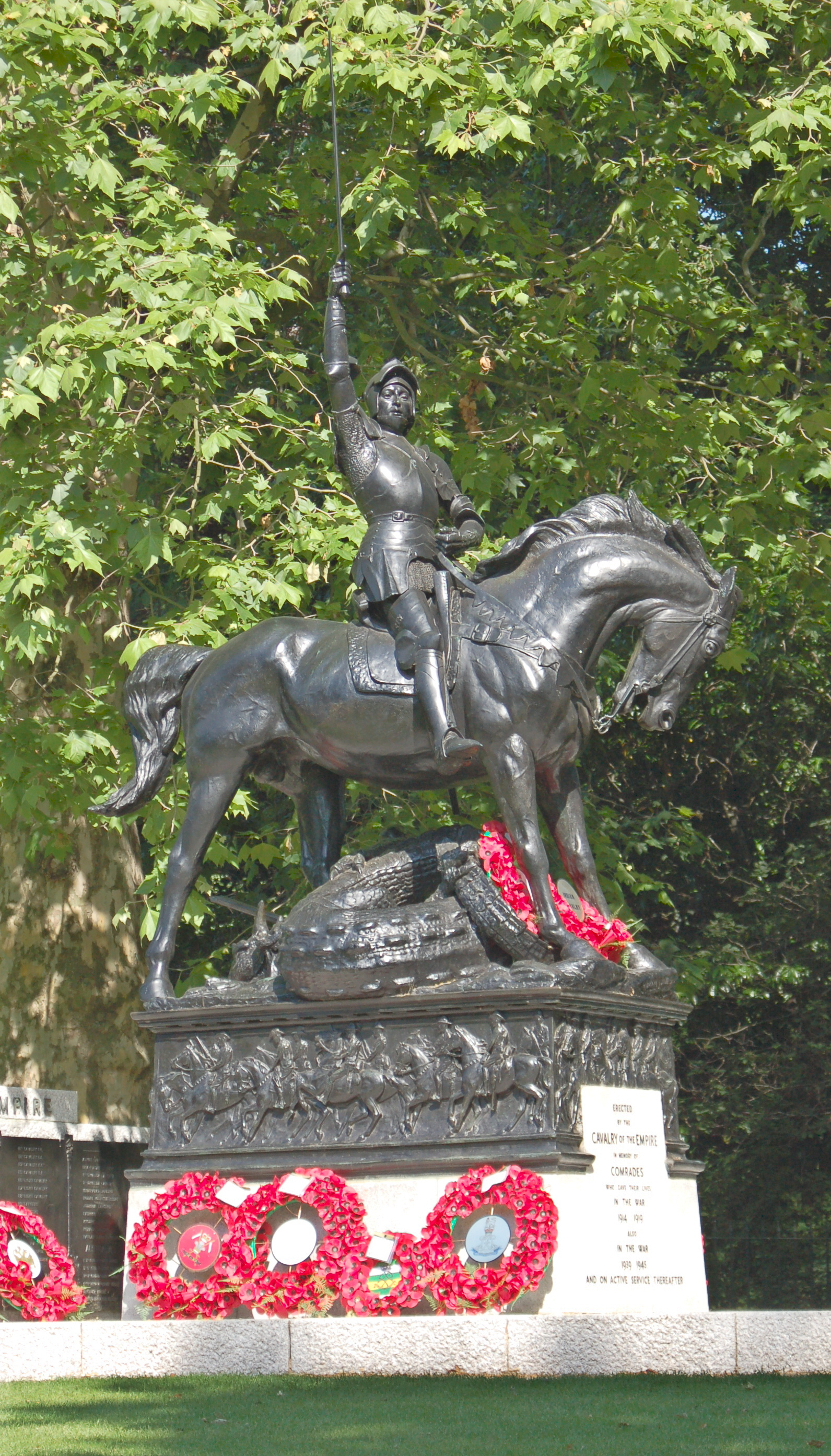
The memorial in 2008

The Cavalry of the Empire Memorial, also known as the Cavalry Memorial, is a war memorial in Hyde Park, London. It commemorates the service of cavalry regiments in the First and Second World Wars. It became a Grade II listed building in 1987, and was promoted to Grade II* in November 2014.

== Background ==
A committee was formed in early 1920 to consider a proposal for a memorial in London to the cavalrymen who had served in the First World War. According to figures in Volume 8 of the History of the British Cavalry 1816–1919 by Henry Paget, 7th Marquess of Anglesey, nearly 4,500 cavalrymen were killed on the Western Front, and another 15,000 were wounded. Sites for a memorial were considered, on The Mall opposite Marlborough Gate or at the Duke of York's Steps, or at Horse Guards Parade, but the Office of Works preferred a location near Stanhope Gate in Hyde Park, in front of Dorchester House.

Sir John James Burnet was appointed as architect, assisted by Thomas Smith Tait, and a statue was designed by Adrian Jones, with advice from Major Victor Farquharson and Sir Henry Farnham Burke. Jones had served as a veterinary officer in the British Army in the late 19th century, including active service in the Abyssinian Expedition of 1868, the First Boer War in 1880–81, and the Nile Expedition of 1884–85.

== Design ==
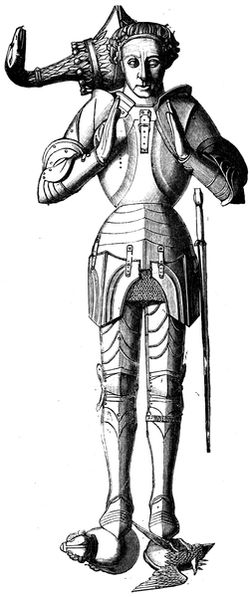
Tomb effigy of the Earl of Warwick, St Mary's Church, Warwick

For the memorial, Jones designed a bronze equestrian statue of St George, depicted as a mounted knight in armour with sword raised aloft, slightly larger than life size, with his horse standing over the coils of a slain dragon (with upturned Germanic moustache). A frieze of horsemen parade around the base of the statue. Some details of St George's armour were copied from a bronze effigy of Richard de Beauchamp, 13th Earl of Warwick from 1454, and the horse was adapted from an engraving of St George by Albrecht Dürer.

The statue was cast from guns captured by the cavalry in the First World War, and mounted on a Portland stone pedestal which bears an inscription, extended after the Second World War to read:

"ERECTED // BY THE // CAVALRY OF THE EMPIRE // IN MEMORY OF // COMRADES // WHO GAVE THEIR LIVES // IN THE WAR // 1914–1919 // ALSO // IN THE WAR // 1939–1945"

Brunet designed a classical backdrop for the statue, built with Portland stone, which shielded the memorial from Park Lane. The backdrop housed a bronze plaque listing the 150 cavalry units from Australia, Canada, India, New Zealand, Pakistan and the UK, that served in the forces of the British Empire in the First World War, along with the names of four British cavalry officers who became Field Marshals: Haig, French, Allenby and Robertson.

== Reception ==
The memorial was unveiled on 21 May 1924 by Field Marshal John French, 1st Earl of Ypres, and the Prince of Wales, accompanied by Prince Arthur of Connaught and the Chaplain-General to the Forces John Taylor Smith.

As Park Lane was widened in 1960, the memorial was moved to a new site about 300 metres (980 ft) further west in 1961, along the Horse Ride beside Serpentine Road, near the Hyde Park bandstand, and re-erected on a granite base. The backdrop was not reconstructed: instead, the bronze plaque was mounted on a granite screen behind the relocated statue.

Nearby is the memorial to the soldiers of the Household Cavalry who were killed in the Hyde Park and Regent's Park bombings in 1982.

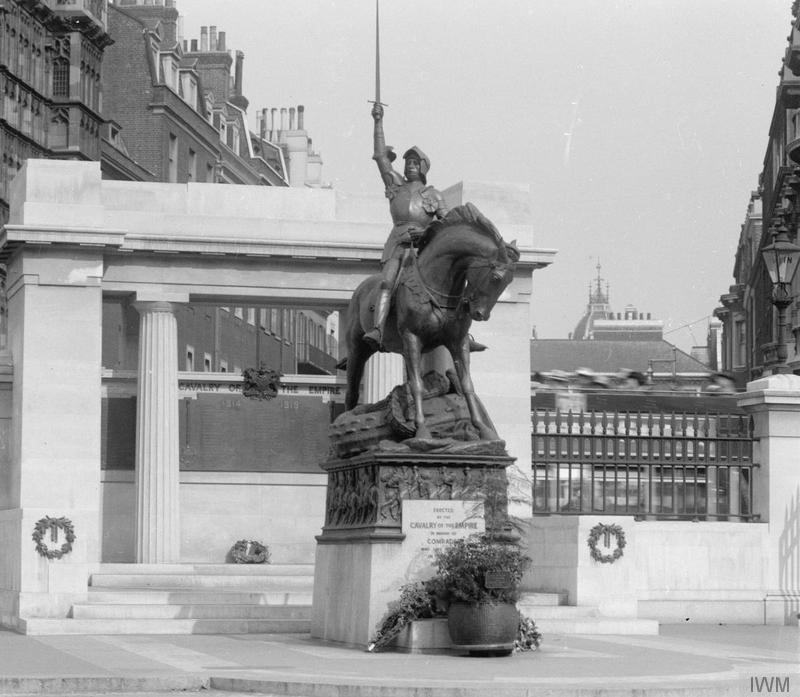
The memorial before the Second World War, in its original position with stone backdrop

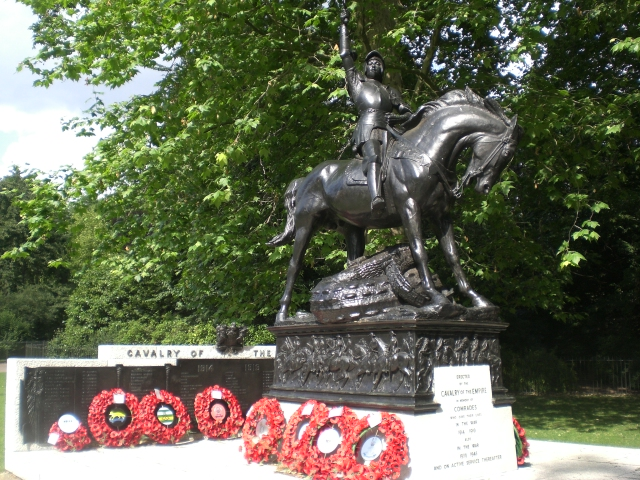
Setting and panels on screen behind

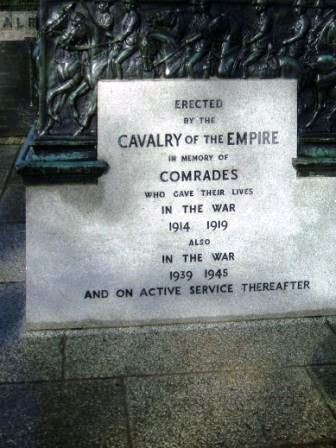
Inscription

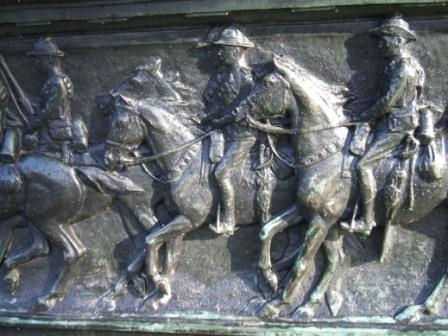
Detail of frieze

== See also ==
- Grade II* listed war memorials in England
