= Adrian Jones (sculptor) =

English sculptor and painter

Alfred Adrian Jones
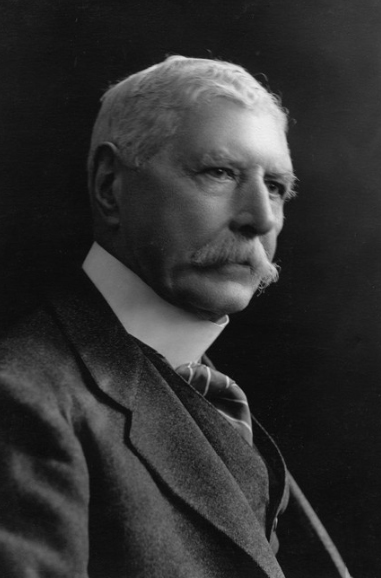
- Born: 9 February 1845; Ludlow, Shropshire, England
- Died: 24 January 1938 (aged 92); Chelsea, London
- Education: Royal Veterinary College
- Known for: Sculpture
- Notable work: Peace descending on the Quadriga of War

Alfred Adrian Jones MVO (9 February 1845 – 24 January 1938) was an English sculptor and painter who specialized in depicting animals, particularly horses. Before becoming a full-time artist he was an army veterinary surgeon for twenty-three years. On retirement from the British Army, Jones established himself as an artist with a studio in London. He became a regular exhibitor at the Royal Academy and in commercial galleries from 1884 onwards. His training as a veterinary surgeon gave him a deep knowledge of equine anatomy which he used in his work to great effect. He created the sculpture Peace descending on the Quadriga of War, on top of the Wellington Arch at Hyde Park Corner in London. Following both the Boer War and World War I, Jones created a number of notable war memorials including the Royal Marines Memorial and the Cavalry of the Empire Memorial, both in central London. Alongside the public monuments he created, Jones made equestrian and equine statuettes and portrait busts. Whilst well known as a sculptor, Jones was also an accomplished painter.

== Biography ==
=== Early life and military career ===
Jones was born in Ludlow, Shropshire, the fourth son of James Brookholding Jones and his wife Jane Marshall, and was educated at Ludlow Grammar School. Despite his wish for a career as an artist, Jones was persuaded by his father to train as a vet. He studied at the Royal Veterinary College, qualifying as a veterinary surgeon in 1866. He enrolled in the British Army as a veterinary officer in the Royal Horse Artillery the following year and served from 1867 to 1890. During this time he saw service in the Abyssinian Expedition of 1868 before joining the 3rd Hussars in 1869. From 1871 to 1881 he served with the Queen's Bays in Ireland and was then attached to the 7th Queen's Own Hussars and fought with them in the First Anglo-Boer War in 1881. In South Africa he was attached to the Inniskilling Dragoons. In 1884 Jones served in Egypt where he selected camels for the Nile Expedition and finally joined the 2nd Life Guards, retiring in 1890 with the rank of captain. He was awarded a medal for his service in Abyssinia and the Khedive's Star for his work on the Nile Expedition. Jones was made a member of the Royal Victorian Order in 1907.

=== Artistic career ===
Jones was already active as an artist by the time he retired from the Army, having painted and sketched throughout his military career. In 1892 he had received some teaching in sculpture techniques from Charles Bell Birch and had shown a plaster statuette, One of the Right Sort, at the Royal Academy in 1884. In 1887 Jones' bronze Gone Away won first prize in the Goldsmith's Company's statuette contest. His terracotta Camel Corps Scout and The Last Arrow in bronze were both well received when exhibited in 1886 and 1888 respectively. Jones became a regular exhibitor at the Royal Academy, at the Royal Glasgow Institute of the Fine Arts and in commercial galleries plus at the Paris Salon and the Royal Institute.

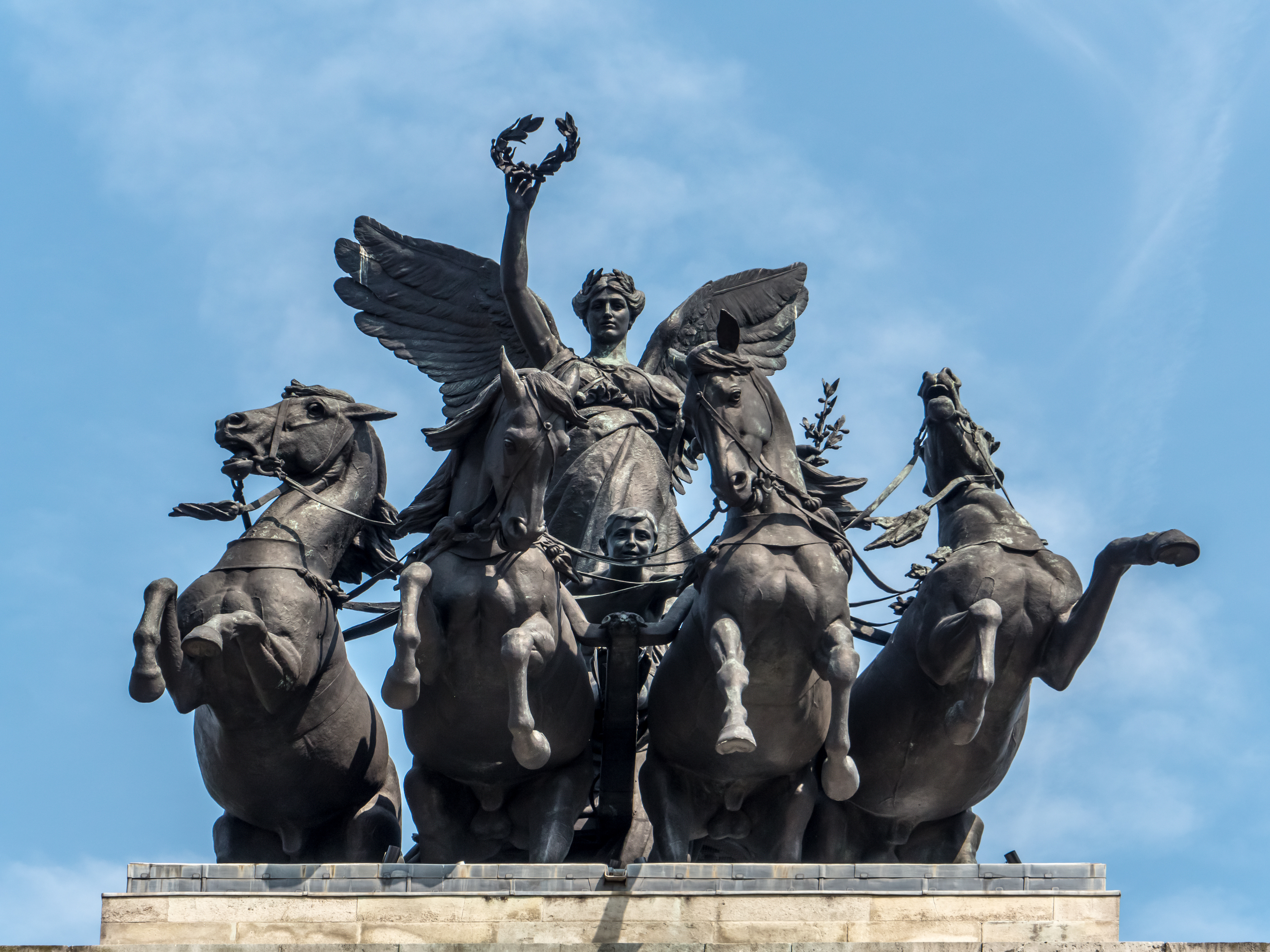
The Quadriga on Wellington Arch

In 1891 Jones exhibited a plaster work, Triumph featuring a quadriga of four horses and a chariot. The model greatly impressed the Prince of Wales who began campaigning for a monumental version to be created for the Wellington Arch in central London. Opposition to this proposal was led by Sir Frederick Leighton, the president of the Royal Academy, who considered the commission beyond the ability of a largely self-taught artist such as Jones. To demonstrate his skill with large scale works, Jones created Duncan's Horses, a plaster equine group shown at the Royal Academy in 1892. Despite insinuations that Duncan's Horses was not by him, Jones won the Wellington Arch commission and worked on Peace descending on the Quadriga of War from 1907 until 1912. Until his death in 1910, Edward VII frequently visited Jones' studio to view progress on what became largest bronze sculpture in Britain. The casting was completed by November 1911 and the complex matter of hoisting the Quadriga into position took place in January 1912. In April 1912 King George V and Queen Mary drove through the arch and were presented to Jones. The addition of a tablet noting that the Quadriga was a gift of Lord Michelham was affixed to the monument in 1916. The young boy in Jones' composition for the Quadriga was based on Lord Michelham's son.

Jones was also an accomplished painter. His notable paintings included a portrait of Lord Kitchener and an equestrian portrait of Sir David Campbell on his Grand National winning horse.

=== Later life ===
Nominated by Goscombe John, Jones became a member of the Royal Society of British Sculptors in 1912 and was elected a Fellow of the same society in 1923. Jones' autobiography, Memoirs of a Soldier Artist was published in 1933. In 1934 Jones became an Honorary Associate of the Royal College of Veterinary Surgeons, and he was also an honorary member of the Incorporated Association of Architects and Surveyors. In 1935 he received the gold medal of the Royal Society of British Sculptors.

Jones was married twice. In 1870 he married Emma Buckingham from Ross-on-Wye who died in 1887 and in 1891 he married Emma Wedlake and established a home and studio with her in Chelsea. That property was next door to the Chelsea Arts Club and Jones became an active member and sometimes office holder of the club. He died of influenza and bronchitis at his home in 147 Old Church Street, Chelsea, in January 1938 aged 92 and was cremated at Golders Green Crematorium. A memorial plaque to Jones is to be found at St Laurence's Church, Ludlow, where his ashes are buried, next to that of the poet Alfred Edward Housman.

== Selected public works ==
=== 1895–1919 ===
Image	Title / subject	Location and coordinates	Date	Type	Material	Dimensions	Designation	Wikidata	Notes
	Persimmon	Sandringham Stud, Norfolk	1895	Equine statue on plinth	Bronze & stone				
	South Australian Boer War Contingents	Ludlow College, Ludlow		Model of horse's head	Plaster				Originally positioned by Ludlow Town Hall, relocated 1988 to National Army Museum, London. Originally a plaster cast of a mounted cavalry man but only the horse's head remains.
More images	Royal Marines Memorial	The Mall, London	1903	Sculpture group on pedestal with plaques	Bronze & Portland stone		Grade II	Q18121475	
More images	South African War Memorial (South Australia)	Government House, Adelaide, Australia	1904	Equestrian statue on pedestal	Bronze & stone			Q7565810	
More images	Statue of Redvers Buller	Exeter, Devon	1905	Equestrian statue on pedestal	Bronze & granite		Grade II	Q26558036	
More images	Statue of Prince George, Duke of Cambridge	Whitehall, London	1907	Equestrian statue on pedestal	Bronze & granite	7.6m tall	Grade II	Q19516037	Cast by A.B. Burton, Thames Ditton Foundry, pedestal by John Belcher
More images	Carabiniers Boer War memorial	Ranelagh Gardens, Chelsea Embankment, London	1906	Three sided screen with reliefs	Brick, stone & bronze			Q63647854	
More images	Peace descending on the Quadriga of War	Wellington Arch, Hyde Park Corner, London	1912	Sculpture group	Bronze		Grade I		Cast by A.B. Burton at the Thames Ditton Foundry.

=== 1920-1929 ===
Image	Title / subject	Location and coordinates	Date	Type	Material	Dimensions	Designation	Wikidata	Notes
More images	Bridgnorth War memorial	Castle Gardens, Bridgnorth, Shropshire	1922	Statue on pedestal	Bronze & stone		Grade II	Q26539222	Statue depicts a King's Shropshire Light Infantry soldier
More images	Royal Gloucestershire Hussars Memorial	College Green, Gloucester	1922	Cross on stepped plinth with bas-reliefs	Stone & bronze		Grade II*	Q26263469	Four relief panels depicting scenes from Gallipoli, Syria, Sinai and Palestine by Jones, additional panel by Edward Payne, stone work by Cash & Wright
More images	Cavalry of the Empire Memorial	Hyde Park, London	1924	Equestrian statue on pedestal with surround	Bronze & stone		Grade II*	Q20794956	Architect, John James Burnet
More images	Uxbridge War memorial	Windsor Circus, Uxbridge, London	1924	Statue on column	Bronze & granite		Grade II	Q28147646	
	Lieutenant-Colonel Charles Berkeley Pigott, CB, DSO, late of 60th Rifles and 21st Lancers	North Aisle, Winchester Cathedral, Hampshire		Memorial plaque					

=== Other works ===
- For the Faith, a 1903 equestrian statuette, current whereabouts unknown, shown at the Royal Academy in 1903.
- A silver statuette of Colonel Asfur Dowla, the A.D.C. to the Nizam of Hyderabad, shown at the Royal Academy in 1903, but current whereabouts unknown.
- In 1985, Jones' 1892 plaster group Duncan's Horses was cast in bronze and erected in the grounds of the Royal Veterinary College, Hawkshead Campus in Hertfordshire.

== Gallery of images ==
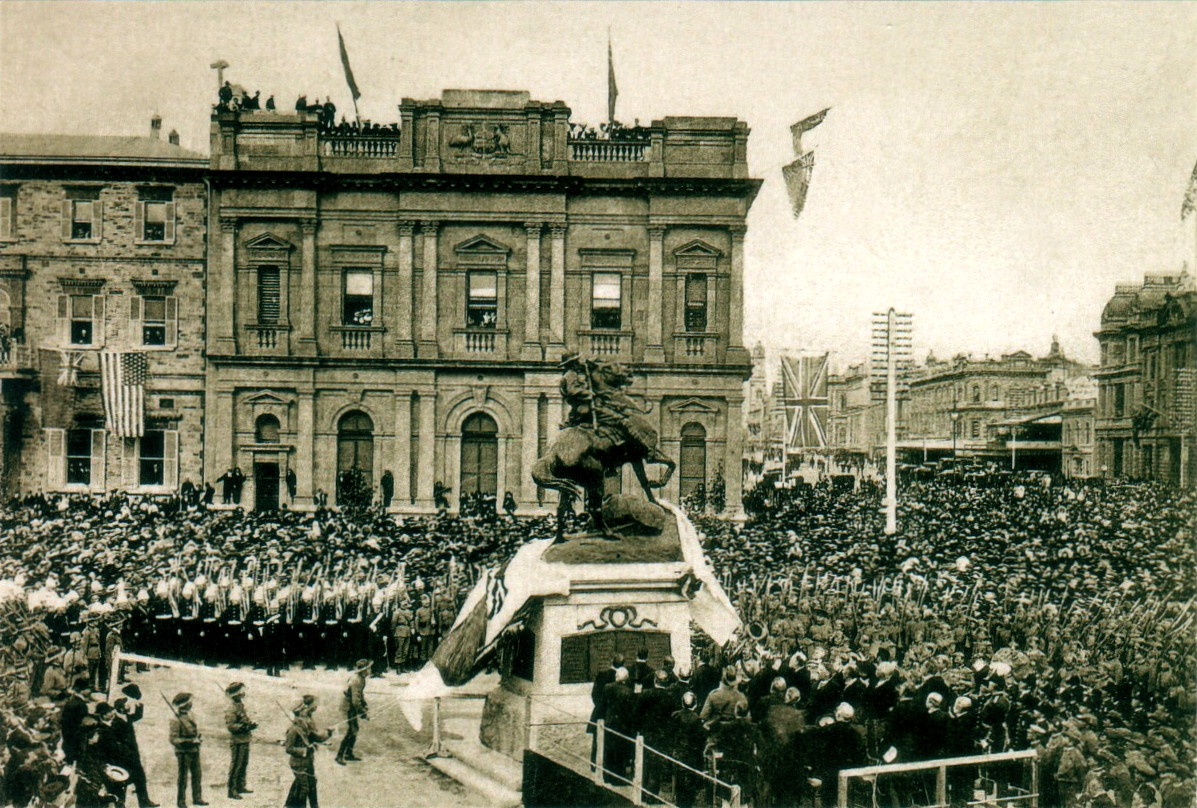
The unveiling of the Boer War Memorial in Adelaide

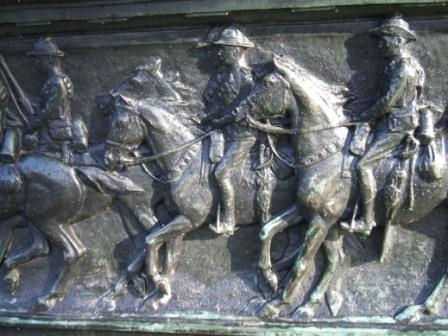
Relief on Cavalry Memorial

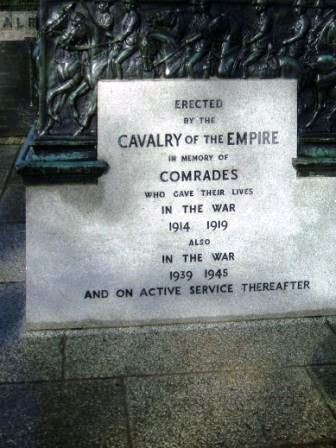
Plaque on Cavalry Memorial

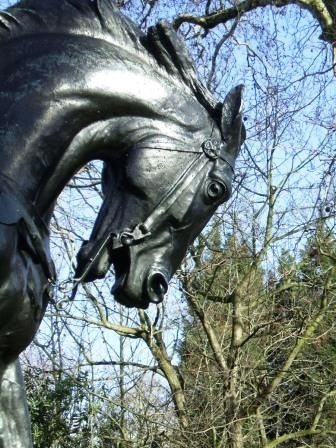
Head of Horse-Cavalry Memorial

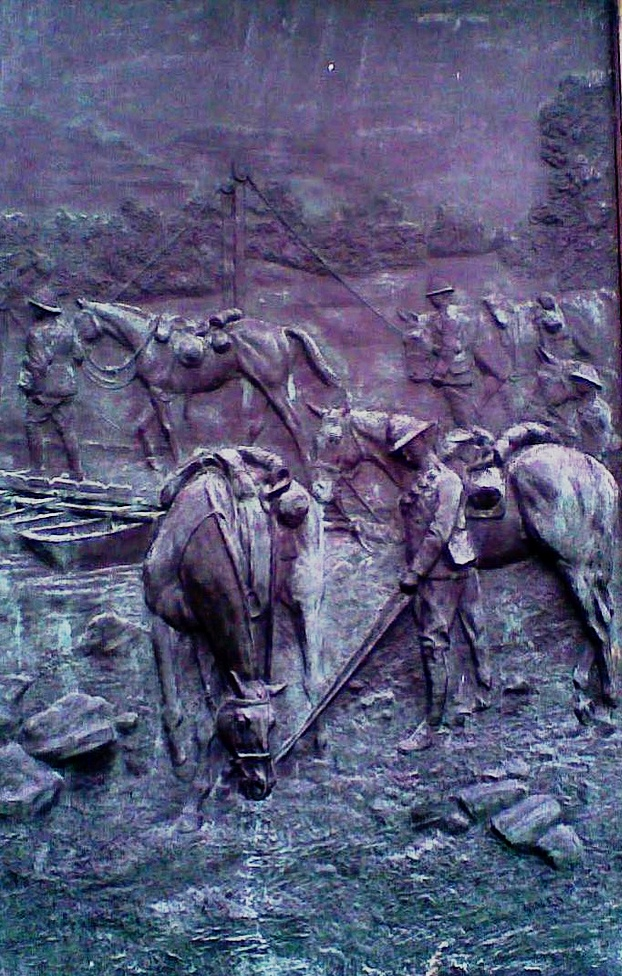
Relief on Gloucester Memorial

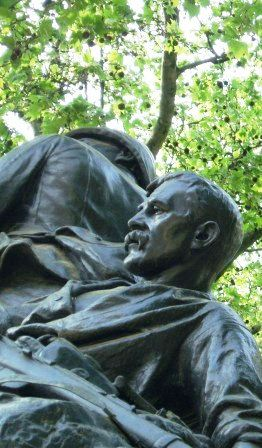
Wounded Marine on Royal National Marine Memorial
