= Equestrian statue of the Duke of Cambridge =

Statue by Adrian Jones in London, England

Equestrian statue of Prince George, Duke of Cambridge
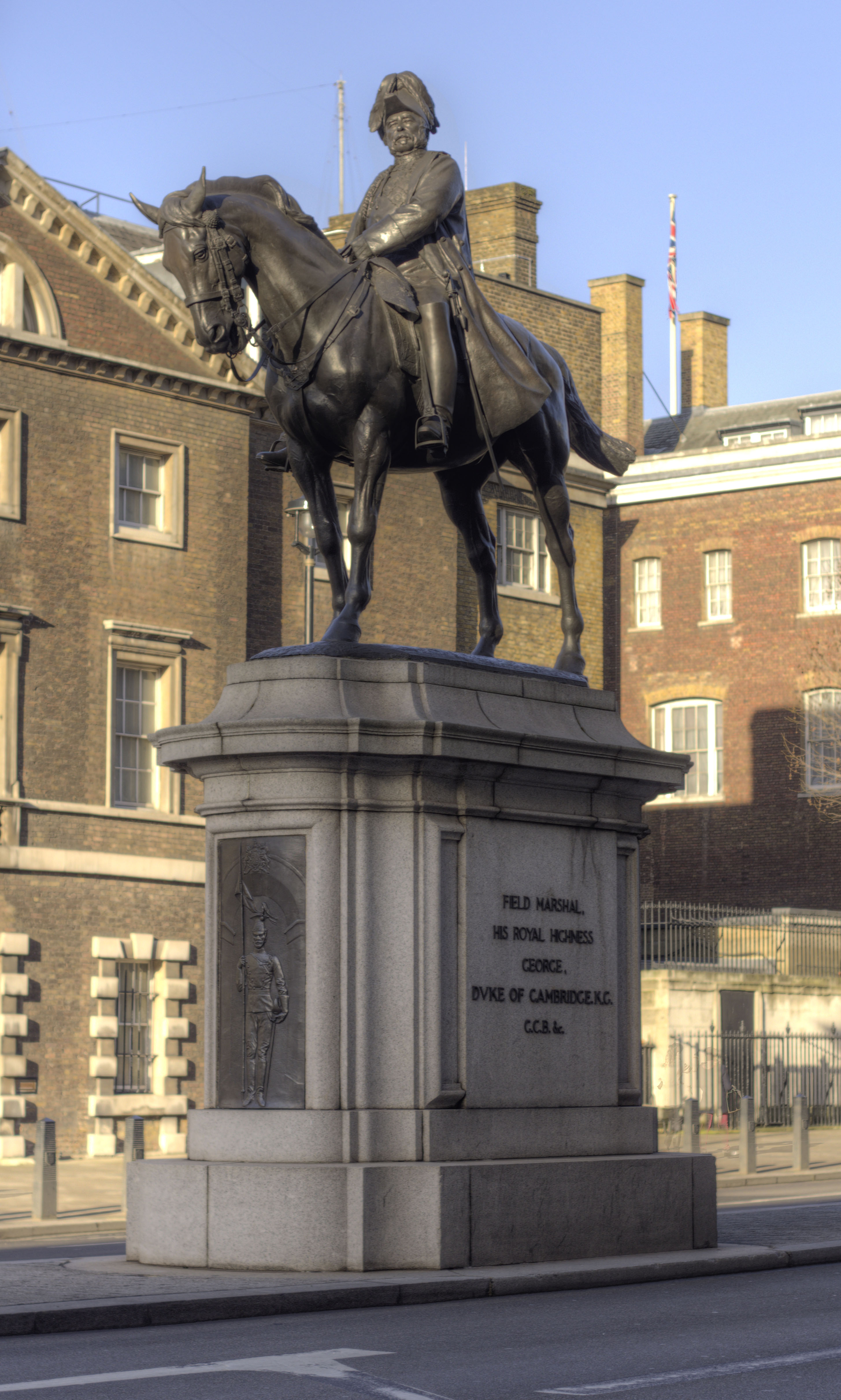
- The statue in 2008
- Artist: Adrian Jones
- Completion date: 18 May 1907; 119 years ago
- Type: Sculpture (equestrian statue)
- Subject: Prince George, Duke of Cambridge
- Location: London; 51°30′19″N 0°07′36″W

The equestrian statue of Prince George, Duke of Cambridge, is a life-size memorial by the sculptor Adrian Jones in Whitehall, London.

== History ==
Prince Arthur, Duke of Connaught and Strathearn, was made chairman of the committee to erect a memorial to his cousin Prince George, Duke of Cambridge. The architect John Belcher and sculptor Adrian Jones collaborated on the project. Belcher led on the original proposal in 1905, in which he requested that Westminster City Council should allow the construction of the statue outside Horse Guards on Whitehall. In July 1906, while the statue was being sculpted at Jones's studio on Church Street, Chelsea, he was visited on one occasion by Queen Alexandra, accompanied by her daughter Princess Victoria, Crown Princess Sophia of Greece, Duchess of Sparta, and Prince George of Greece and Denmark.

By the following October, the committee had changed its mind on the location of the statue. The new War Office building had opened in August, and they requested an amendment to the permission granted by Westminster City Council for a change of site so that the statue could be placed outside that building instead. Once again, this request was approved. The construction of the plinth was contracted out to a building company, Pethick Brothers, and it was completed on 18 May 1907. Forty-five tonnes of granite was used, and the combined height of the plinth and statue was expected to be some 25 feet (7.6 m). The statue was added shortly afterwards during the night, and was then obscured until the unveiling. It was unveiled on 15 June 1907 by King Edward VII, who had been escorted from Buckingham Palace by a detachment of 2nd Life Guards. He was accompanied on the journey and at the ceremony by Queen Alexandria, Princess Victoria, the Prince of Wales, the Duke of Connaught and Strathearn, and Prince Christian of Schleswig-Holstein.

Other attendees at the ceremony included several members of the 24th (2nd Rhenish) Infantry Regiment "von Goeben" of the German Army, of which the Duke had been an honorary colonel. The group was led by Field Marshal Wilhelm von Hahnke. A variety of British military personnel were also present, including Major-General Wykeham Leigh Pemberton. During the ceremony the King declared, "The statue I am about to unveil is committed to the care of the City of Westminster". This was unexpected, as the statue was actually owned by the Office of Works. Some two weeks passed before the two offices came to an agreement that it would be handed back from the City of Westminster to the Office of Works.

In November 2012, a nude man mounted the statue for more than an hour until he was persuaded to come down and was taken into police custody.

== Design ==
Jones sculpted the Duke of Cambridge on horseback, wearing the full-uniform of a Field Marshal. It included his medals, such as four orders of knighthood and his campaign medals. The figure holds in its hand a baton, intended to represent the one which was presented to the Duke's father by King William IV, and in the other hand it holds the reins of the horse. On the sides of the plinth there are two bas-relief panels showing the Duke's connection with the Grenadier Guards and the 17th Lancers.

== See also ==
- 1907 in art
