= Equestrian statue of George Stuart White =

1922 Statue by John Tweed

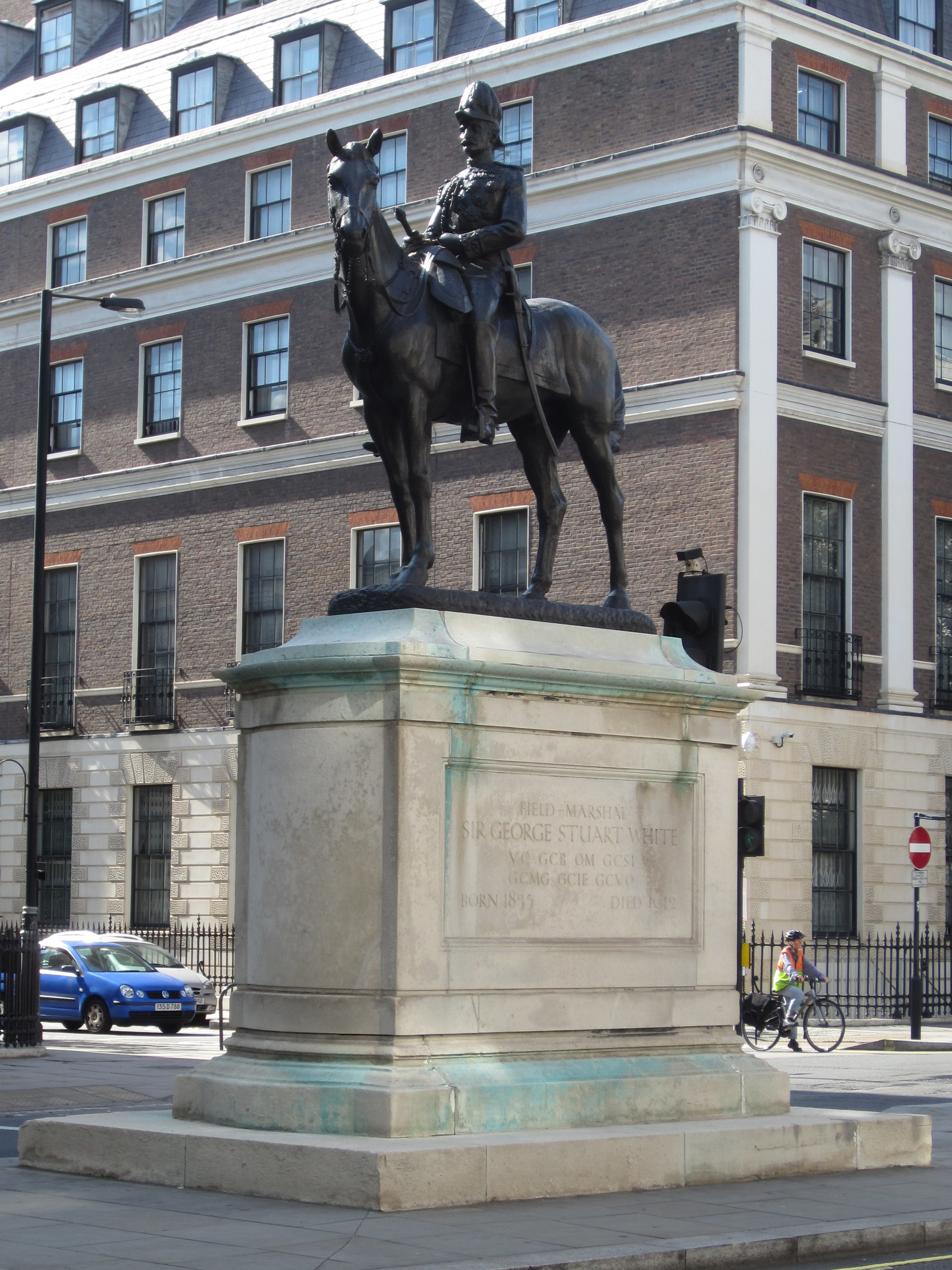
- The statue in 2014
- Artist: John Tweed
- Year: 1922
- Medium: Bronze
- Subject: George Stuart White
- Designation: Grade II listed
- Location: Portland Place, London; 51.5208°N 0.1453°W

The equestrian statue of George Stuart White is a Grade II listed outdoor bronze sculpture depicting Field Marshal Sir George Stuart White, an officer of the British Army, located in Portland Place, London, England. The sculptor was John Tweed and the statue was unveiled in 1922.

An inscription on each side of the plinth reads:

Field-Marshal Sir George Stuart White, V.C., G.C.B., O.M., G.C.S.I., G.C.M.G., G.C.I.E., G.C.V.O. Born 1835. Died, 1912.

The statue appeared in an exterior shot of Portland Place from Alfred Hitchcock's 1947 American courtroom drama, The Paradine Case, which was set in England.
