= List of public art in the Royal Borough of Kensington and Chelsea =

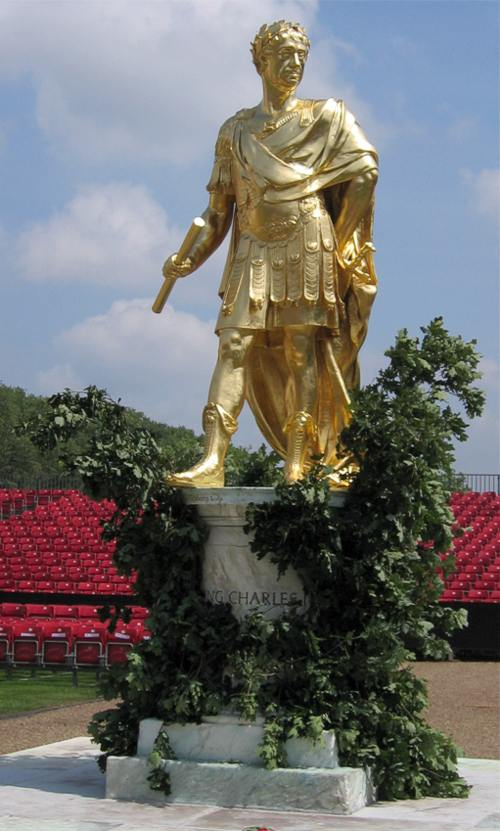
The statue of Charles II by Grinling Gibbons at Royal Hospital Chelsea

This is a list of public art in the Royal Borough of Kensington and Chelsea.

== Belgravia ==
See the list of public art in Belgravia.

== Brompton ==
Image	Title / subject	Location and coordinates	Date	Artist / designer	Type	Material	Designation	Notes
More images	Statue of Cardinal John Henry Newman	Brompton Oratory	1895	Léon-Joseph Chavalliaud	Statue under canopy	Campanella marble and Portland stone	Grade II	Unveiled 15 June 1896. Architects: G. F. Bodley and Thomas Garner.
	Fawn	Royal Society of Sculptors headquarters, 108 Old Brompton Road	1973 (?)	Cecil Thomas	Sculpture	Stone	—N/a	Dora House was the sculptor's home from 1919 until his death in 1976, when he bequeathed it to the society to serve as its headquarters.
	The Return of the Prodigal	Cottage Place (the approach road to Holy Trinity Brompton)	2005	Charlie Mackesy	Sculpture	Bronze; stone pedestal	—N/a	Presented to the church by the sculptor, a regular guest preacher there.

== Chelsea ==
Image	Title / subject	Location and coordinates	Date	Artist / designer	Type	Material	Designation	Notes
More images	Statue of Charles II	Royal Hospital, Figure Court 51.4871°N 0.1577°W	1676	Grinling Gibbons	Statue	Gilt bronze	Grade I	Commissioned by the royal servant Tobias Rustat, presented to the King in 1682 and installed in the Royal Hospital in 1692. Gilding removed 1782 and restored 2002.
	Millar Obelisk	Dovehouse Green, off the King's Road	1751	?	Obelisk		—N/a	
	Chillianwallah Memorial	Royal Hospital, South Grounds	1853	Charles Robert Cockerell	Obelisk		Grade II	
	Two women, a warrior over a chariot and horses, two eagles and two caryatids	The Pheasantry, King's Road	1881	Amédée Joubert	Architectural sculpture		Grade II	
	Herbert Stewart Memorial Fountain	Hans Place	late 19th century	Joseph Whitehead and Joseph Edgar Boehm (medallion)	Drinking fountain with relief sculpture		—N/a	Erected by the Metropolitan Drinking Fountain and Cattle Trough Association. Stewart lived nearby at 40 Cadogan Place.
More images	Relief of Thomas Carlyle	Carlyle's House, 24 Cheyne Row	1886	Benjamin Creswick after C. F. A. Voysey	Relief	Marble	Grade II	
	Christ, the Apostles, bishop, king and an angel with the Shield of the Trinity	Over entrance to Holy Trinity, Sloane Street	1890	John Dando Sedding	Architectural sculpture (relief)		Grade I	
	Cow's Head	Old Church Street	1908	?	Architectural sculpture	Terracotta	—N/a	
	Cow's Head	Old Church Street	1908	?	Architectural sculpture	Terracotta	—N/a	
	More and Erasmus; Mazzini and Carlyle	15 Cheyne Walk	c. 1910s	Arthur George Walker	Reliefs	Sandstone	Grade II*	Two panels on the theme of friendship, commissioned by Lord Courtney.
More images	Chelsea War Memorial	Sloane Square 51.4926°N 0.1570°W	1920	Reginald Blomfield	Cross		Grade II	Unveiled 24 October 1920. Follows Blomfield’s Cross of Sacrifice design.
	Fountain	Wellington Square	1926	Swan Brothers	Fountain with sculpture	Portland stone	—N/a	
	Portrait roundel of William Friese-Greene	King's Road, outside No. 208	1934	Newbury Abbot Trent	Architectural sculpture		—N/a	
	Statue of Nell Gwyn	Nell Gwynn House, Sloane Avenue			Architectural sculpture		—N/a	
More images	Venus Fountain	Sloane Square	1953	Gilbert Ledward	Fountain with sculpture	Bronze	Grade II	Unveiled 26 October 1953. Architect: Sir Charles Maufe.
	Girl with Doves	Cadogan Square	1970	David Wynne	Statue	Bronze	—N/a	
	The Dancers	Cadogan Place	1971	David Wynne	Sculptural group	Bronze	—N/a	
	Dancer with Bird	Cadogan Square	1974	David Wynne	Statue	Bronze	—N/a	
	Young Girl	Sloane Gardens	1980	Karin Jonzen	Statue	Bronze	—N/a	
More images	The In-Pensioner	Royal Hospital, North Front	2000	Philip Jackson	Statue	Bronze	—N/a	Unveiled 4 May 2000.
	My Children	Duke of York Square	2002	Allister Bowtell (sculptures), Richard Kindersley (pedestal)	Sculptures	Bronze	—N/a	The two sculptures represent children from the Royal Military Asylum formerly in the square.
More images	Statue of Hans Sloane	Duke of York Square	2005	Simon Smith after John Michael Rysbrack	Statue	Portland stone	—N/a	Unveiled 14 June 2007.
More images	In-Pensioner	Royal Hospital, Light Horse Court	2009	Mary Catterall	Statue	Bronze	—N/a	A gift of the sculptor.
More images	Head of Oscar Wilde	Dovehouse Green, off the King's Road 51.4873°N 0.1696°W	2024	Eduardo Paolozzi	Sculpture	Bronze	—N/a	Produced posthumously from the original maquette, this work was installed here in 2024 to mark the sculptor's centenary. Wilde lived in two addresses on Tite Street, Chelsea, and Paolozzi lived on the King's Road.
	Cascade	The Gaumont, King's Road	2025	Shezad Dawood	Façade panels	Ceramic	—N/a	Inspired by James Abbott McNeill Whistler's Nocturne in Black and Gold (1875).
	Chelsea Arts Club frontages	143 Old Church Street, London, SW3 6EB 51°29′17″N 0°10′29″W	various	various	Murals		—N/a	

=== Chelsea Embankment ===
Image	Title / subject	Location and coordinates	Date	Artist / designer	Type	Material	Designation	Notes
More images	George Sparkes Memorial Drinking Fountain	Cheyne Walk	1880	Charles Barry Jr.	Drinking fountain	Granite	—N/a	
More images	Statue of Thomas Carlyle	Chelsea Embankment Gardens, west of Oakley Street 51.4832°N 0.1691°W	1882	Joseph Edgar Boehm	Statue	Bronze statue on red granite pedestal	Grade II	
More images	Memorial to Dante Gabriel Rossetti	Chelsea Embankment Gardens, outside 16 Cheyne Walk (Rossetti's house) 51.4837°N 0.1658°W	1887	Ford Madox Brown (bust)	Drinking fountain with bust	Grey granite and bronze	Grade II	Unveiled 14 July 1887 by William Holman Hunt. Designed by the architect John Pollard Seddon; Rossetti had died in Seddon's cottage in Bridlington, Yorkshire, in 1882.
More images	Carabiniers Boer War Memorial	Built into the railings of Ranelagh Gardens, opposite Chelsea Bridge	1905	Adrian Jones	Screen with relief panels	Red brick, Portland stone and bronze	—N/a	
More images	Awakening	Roper's Gardens	1915	Gilbert Ledward	Statue	Bronze	—N/a	Installed on this site in 1965.
More images	Atalanta	Near Albert Bridge	1929	Francis Derwent Wood	Statue	Bronze	Grade II	Based on a plaster sculpture of 1907 and one in marble of 1909. A bronze was installed on this site in 1929.
More images	Margaret Damer Dawson Memorial Bird Bath	Chelsea Embankment Gardens	1933	Charles James Pibworth	Bird bath	Portland stone	—N/a	
More images	Woman Removing Her Dress	Roper's Gardens	1950	Jacob Epstein	Bas relief	Portland stone	—N/a	Unveiled 3 June 1972.
More images	Statue of Thomas More	Outside Chelsea Old Church, Cheyne Walk	1968	Leslie Cubitt Bevis	Statue		—N/a	Unveiled 21 July 1969.
More images	The Boy David	Chelsea Embankment Gardens, east of Oakley Street	1971	Edward Bainbridge Copnall after Francis Derwent Wood	Statuette on column	Fibreglass statuette on a pink granite column	—N/a	Unveiled 8 May 1971. Previously Wood's half-size model of the figure for his Machine Gun Corps Memorial stood here; this was stolen in 1969.
More images	Boy with a Dolphin	Cheyne Walk, corner of Oakley Street	1974	David Wynne	Sculptural group	Bronze	—N/a	Unveiled 13 October 1975.
More images	Statue of James McNeill Whistler	Whistler's Reach, near Battersea Bridge	2003	Nicholas Dimbleby	Statue	Bronze	—N/a	Unveiled 15 September 2005.
More images	Bust of Ralph Vaughan Williams	Chelsea Embankment Gardens	2012	Marcus Cornish	Bust		—N/a	Unveiled 5 September 2012.
More images	Statue of Hans Sloane	Chelsea Physic Garden	2014	Simon Smith after John Michael Rysbrack	Statue	Portland stone	—N/a	Unveiled 28 April 2014 by Lord Cadogan, a descendant of Sloane's. Based on Rysbrack's marble original of 1733, moved from this site to the British Museum in 1983. This replica is the third to stand here; its predecessors in fibreglass and jesmonite both deteriorated quickly.

== Kensington ==
See the list of public art in Kensington and the list of public art in Kensington Gardens.

== Knightsbridge ==
See the list of public art in Knightsbridge.

== Ladbroke Grove ==
Image	Title / subject	Location and coordinates	Date	Artist / designer	Type	Designation	Notes
	Memorial to the Ladbroke Grove rail crash	Canal Way	2001	Richard Healy	Stele	—N/a	

== Bibliography ==
- Cavanagh, Terry (2023). Public Sculpture of Kensington and Chelsea with Westminster South-West. Public Sculpture of Britain. Vol. 22. Watford: Public Statues and Sculpture Association. ISBN 978-1-8383976-2-3.
- Matthews, Peter (2018). London's Statues and Monuments. Oxford: Shire Publications.
- Nolan, David; Starren, Caroline (2012). On Public View: A journey around the sculpture of the Royal Borough of Kensington and Chelsea. Royal Borough of Kensington and Chelsea.
  - 01–19 (PDF)
  - 20–39 (PDF)
  - 40–47 (PDF)
  - 48–64 (PDF)
  - 65–79 (PDF)
  - 80–93 (PDF)
