= The Crucified Soldier =

Alleged World War I atrocity

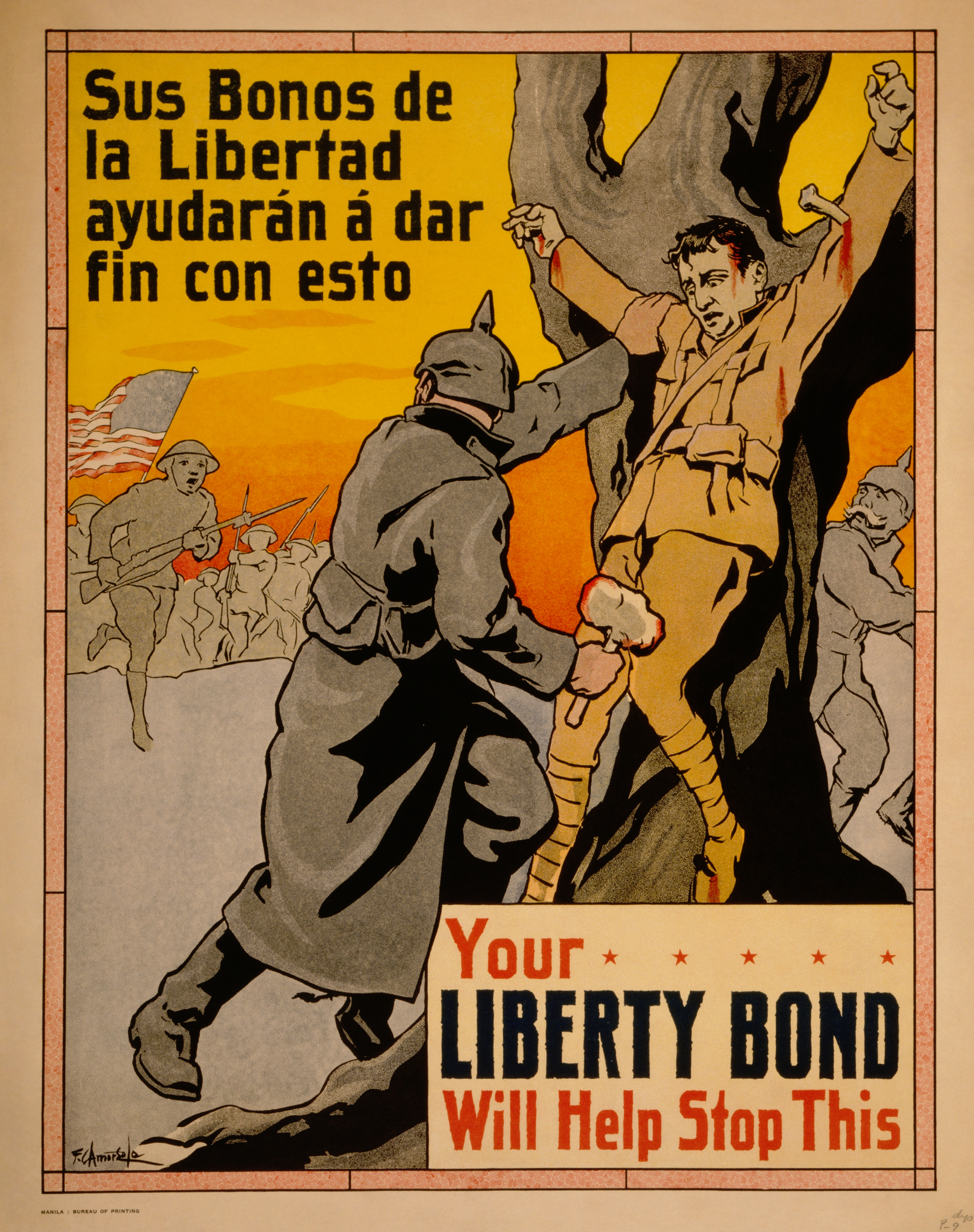
American propaganda poster from the Philippines depicting the crucified soldier

"The Crucified Soldier" was a myth among the allies of World War I, describing German soldiers supposedly crucifying an Allied soldier to a barn door or tree somewhere on the Western Front. The victim is typically described as a still-living sergeant of the Canadian Corps, though the details of the crime, including the origin, rank, and number of victims, vary between tellings. Eyewitnesses claim they saw an unidentified crucified Canadian soldier near the battlefield of Ypres, Belgium, on or around 24 April 1915, but accounts were contradictory, no crucified body was recovered and the identity of the alleged crucified soldier was not discovered at the time.

A dramatized depiction titled Canada's Golgotha was the subject of a formal complaint by the German government during peace negotiations in 1919, forcing Canada to retract claims as to the event's veracity upon being unable to provide the Germans with proof. The story has since been largely dismissed as an urban legend or work of atrocity propaganda akin to the German Corpse Factory or baby mutilation claims, though a 21st-century investigation claimed to uncover evidence of a genuine incident involving a Canadian soldier.

== Story ==
On 10 May 1915 The Times printed a short item titled "Torture of a Canadian Officer" as coming from its Paris correspondent. According to the piece, Canadian soldiers wounded at Ypres had told how one of their officers had been crucified to a wall "by bayonets thrust through his hands and feet" before having another bayonet driven through his throat and, finally, "riddled with bullets". The soldiers said that it had been seen by the Royal Dublin Fusiliers and that they had heard the Fusiliers' officers talking about it.

Two days later, on 12 May, in the House of Commons of the United Kingdom, Robert Houston asked Harold Tennant, the Under-Secretary of State for War, "whether he has any information regarding the crucifixion of three Canadian soldiers recently captured by the Germans, who nailed them with bayonets to the side of a wooden structure?" Tennant replied that no information as to such an atrocity having been perpetrated had yet reached the War Office. Houston then asked if Tennant was aware that Canadian officers and Canadian soldiers who were eyewitnesses of the incidents had made affidavits, and whether the officer in command at Boulogne had not called the attention of the War Office to them. It was then stated that inquiries would be made.

On 15 May The Times published a letter from a member of the army, according to which the crucified soldier was in fact a sergeant, and he had been found transfixed to the wooden fence of a farm building. The letter added that he had been repeatedly stabbed with bayonets and that there were many puncture wounds in his body. The unidentified correspondent had not heard that the crucifixion had been witnessed by any Allied forces and commented that there was room to suppose that the man had been dead when he was crucified.

On 19 May Robert Houston returned to the subject in the House of Commons, asking Harold Tennant:

whether he has any official information showing that during the recent fighting, when the Canadians were temporarily driven back, they were compelled to leave about forty of their wounded comrades in a barn and that on recapturing the position they found the Germans had bayoneted all the wounded with the exception of a sergeant, and that the Germans had removed the figure of Christ from the large village crucifix and fastened the sergeant while alive to the cross; and whether he is aware that the crucifixion of our soldiers is becoming a practice of the Germans?

— Robert Houston, 19 May 1915

Tennant replied that the military authorities in France had standing instructions to send details of any authenticated atrocities committed against British troops, and that no official information had been received. He added that inquiries were being made, and were not yet complete.

Colonel Ernest J. Chambers, the Canadian chief censor, began investigating the story soon after it surfaced. He searched for eyewitnesses, and found a private who swore under affidavit that he had seen three Canadian soldiers bayonetted to a barn door three miles from St. Julien. However, the sworn testimony from the two English soldiers, who claimed to have seen "the corpse of a Canadian soldier fastened with bayonets to a barn door", was subsequently debunked when it was discovered that the part of the front involved had never been occupied by Germans.

The story made headline news around the world and the Allies repeatedly used the supposed incident in their war propaganda, including the US propaganda film The Prussian Cur (1918) produced by the Fox Film Corporation, which included scenes of an Allied soldier's crucifixion. It bears relation to other propaganda of the time like the Rape of Belgium and the Angels of Mons, and the "German Corpse-Rendering Works" (Kadaververwertungsanstalt).

Robert Graves mentions the story in his autobiography Good-Bye to All That, describing it as "unsubstantiated".

=== Variations ===
The story often varied, though the most common version told how the Germans had captured a Canadian soldier and crucified him with bayonets on a wooden cross, while Maple Copse, near Sanctuary Wood in the Ypres sector, was the favoured setting. The victim was not always Canadian: Ian Hay, who dated the incident to spring 1915, maintained that the victim was British, and that he was crucified on a tree by German cavalrymen. A version which appeared in the Los Angeles newspapers kept the Canadian nationality, but made it two soldiers.

A Canadian soldier who allegedly helped take down the soldier's body suggested the crucified soldier appeared to be a sergeant from the medical service and was possibly from Brantford, and at some point the victim was identified as Sergeant Thomas Elliott, of Brantford. Elliott himself later wrote to his local pastor to report that he was not the man involved.

According to Private George Barrie of the 13th Battalion, he saw a party of Germans in the village of St. Julien on 24 April 1915, which had been in the rear of the 1st Canadian Division until a gas attack on 22 April, when it became the front line. Barrie reported that he saw what appeared to be a man in British uniform who had been crucified to a post by eight bayonets.

== Derwent Wood sculpture ==
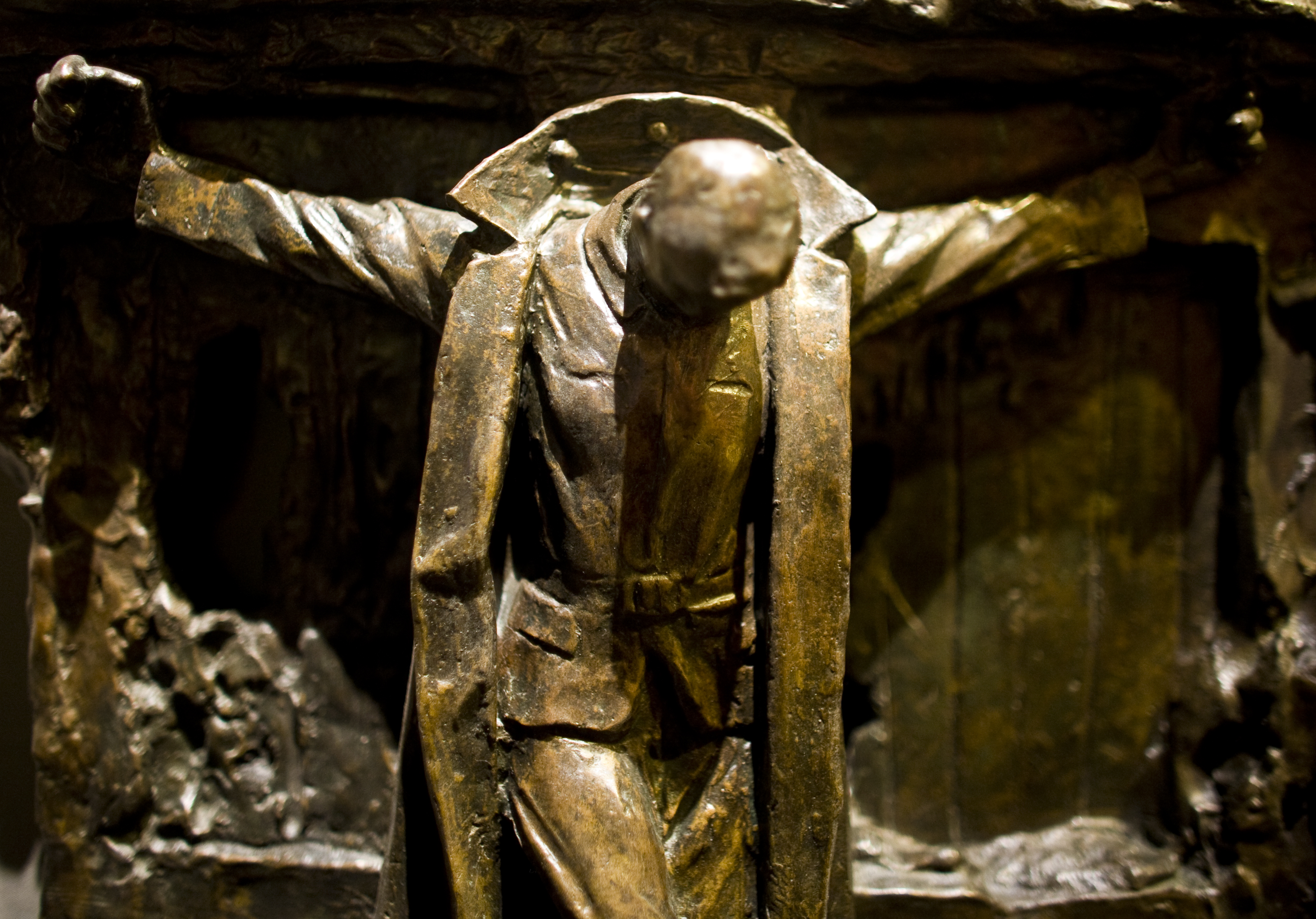
Depiction of the crucified soldier on the sculpture titled Canada's Golgotha, by Francis Derwent Wood (crafted in 1918). The exhibition of the piece has been the subject of controversy.

In 1918 British artist Francis Derwent Wood created a 32-inch-high (810 mm) bronze sculpture entitled Canada's Golgotha which depicted a Canadian soldier crucified on a barn door and surrounded by jeering Germans. It was to be included in the exhibition of the Canadian War Memorial Fund collection, and was widely publicized before the exhibition opened.

The exhibition, at Burlington House, London, was due to open in January 1919, just before the signing of the Paris Peace Treaty and Canadian Prime Minister Sir Robert Borden requested further investigation into the veracity of the story, while the German government formally requested that the Canadian government publicly acknowledge that the story of the crucified soldier was untrue, or else provide evidence. The official Canadian response to the Germans was that they had sufficient evidence to believe that the account was true, including that the victim was a "Sergeant Brant", but when the Germans demanded a part in the investigation, the sculpture was withdrawn from the exhibition and was not shown again until the 1990s.

The sculpture was also displayed in 2000 at an exhibition entitled "Under the Sign of the Cross: Creative Expressions of Christianity in Canada" at the Canadian Museum of Civilization in 2000, and again provoked controversy.

== Sergeant Harry Band ==
British documentary film maker Iain Overton investigated the story of the crucified soldier (as well as other myths of World War I) in his doctoral dissertation, and developed them into a television documentary which was transmitted in 2002 as part of UK Channel 4's Secret History series. Overton uncovered new historical evidence which he said identified the crucified soldier as Sergeant Harry Band of the Central Ontario Regiment of the Canadian Infantry, who was reported missing in action on 24 April 1915 near Ypres. Other soldiers in his unit wrote to Band's sister Elizabeth Petrie to express their condolences, and a year later, one of them wrote in a letter to her that her suspicions that her brother had been "the crucified soldier" were true. Band's body was never recovered, and he is commemorated on the Menin Gate memorial.

The evidence discovered by Overton included a typewritten note by a British nurse found in the Liddle Collection of war correspondence in Leeds University. The note related comments by a Lance Corporal C.M. Brown to his nurse, Miss Ursula Violet Chaloner, whom he told of a Sergeant Harry Band who was "crucified after a battle of Ypres on one of the doors of a barn with five bayonets in him."

Some accounts erroneously name the soldier identified in Overton's documentary as "Harry Banks", thus creating an apparent contradiction in that the only Canadian soldier of that name enlisted in the Overseas Expeditionary Force on 1 September 1915 in Victoria, British Columbia, some five months after the supposed crucifixion.

== In popular culture ==
- American artist George Bellows, who made several anti-German works during the war, created a lithograph titled Gott Strafe (England) depicting German troops crucifying Allied soldiers.
- A French zouave is crucified by German uhlans in Robert W. Service's 1916 poem "Jean Desprez" (published in Rhymes of a Red Cross Man).
- The story is referenced in Dalton Trumbo's 1938 novel Johnny Got His Gun; the main character mentions that he read it in the news.
- The story is mentioned frequently in Paul Gross' film Passchendaele, although the main character, Michael Dunne, claims that the incident stems from exaggeration and that artillery fire was responsible for appearing to pin the body of a soldier to a barn door.

== See also ==
- Crucified boy

== Bibliography ==
=== References ===
- Hansard, ed. (12 May 1915). "Crucifixion of Canadians (Reported)". UK Parliament (Debates).
- Times (The). London. LCCN sn85-54080; ISSN 0140-0460; OCLC 6967919 (all editions).
1. "Torture of a Canadian Officer" (from our own correspondent). Paris, May 9 (issue: whole no. 40850) (Late War ed.). May 10, 1915. p. 7 (column 4, bottom).
  1. Via Newspapers.com.
  2. Via Newspapers.com. p. 7 (digital image 25).
