= Canada's Golgotha =

1918 sculpture by Francis Derwent Wood

Coordinates: 45.417156°N 75.71683°W

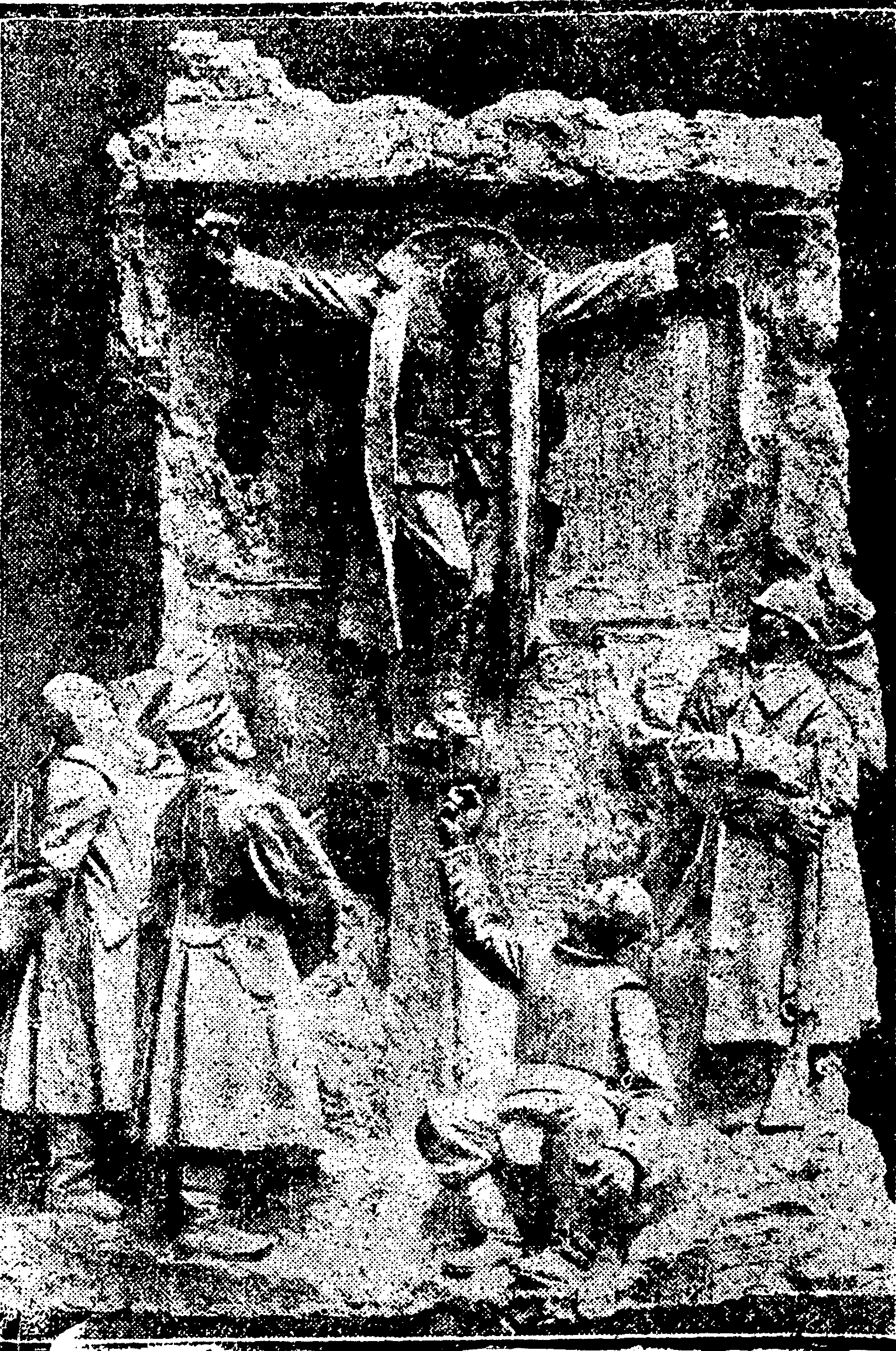
- Artist: Francis Derwent Wood
- Year: 1918
- Medium: Bronze sculpture
- Subject: The Crucified Soldier
- Dimensions: 810 mm (32 in)
- Location: Canadian War Museum; Ottawa, Ontario Canada

Canada's Golgotha is a 32-inch-high (810 mm) bronze sculpture by the British sculptor Francis Derwent Wood, produced in 1918. It illustrates the story of the Crucified Soldier from the First World War and depicts a Canadian soldier crucified on a barn door and surrounded by jeering Germans. It is now on show at the Canadian War Museum.

== Background ==
The story of the crucified soldier emerged in 1915, when it was claimed that a Canadian officer (later said to have been a sergeant) was crucified by German soldiers. The authenticity of the event was never established, though several soldiers claimed to have seen the body of the victim on display.

The title refers to Calvary, the site of the Crucifixion of Jesus in scripture.

Two sworn statements were presented, and one from a Victoria Cross holder attached a name to the victim: "Sergeant Brant". The sworn testimony from the two English soldiers, who claimed to have seen "the corpse of a Canadian soldier fastened with bayonets to a barn door", was subsequently debunked when it was discovered that the part of the front involved had never been occupied by Germans. In 2002 British documentary maker Iain Overton alleged that the crucified soldier did exist, and named him as Sergeant Harry Band (not "Brant").

== Controversy ==
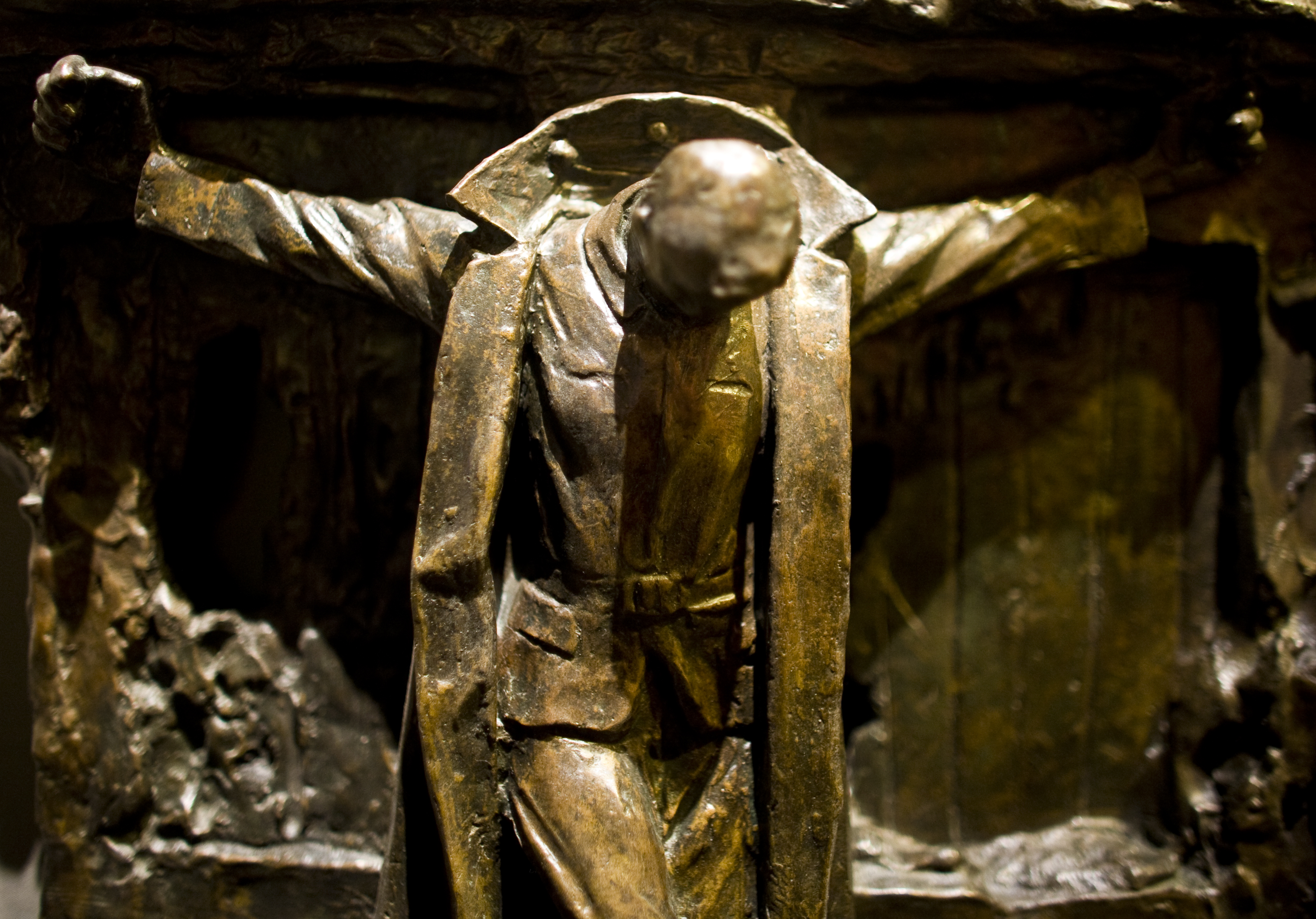
A detail of the central figure of Francis Derwent Wood's Canada's Golgotha (1918) at the Canadian War Museum, Ottawa, Ontario Canada

The sculpture was included in the exhibition of the Canadian War Memorial Fund collection in London, and was widely publicized before the exhibition opened. It was reproduced in more than one British newspaper, notably the Daily Mail. The exhibition, at Burlington House, London, was due to open in January 1919, just before the signing of the Treaty of Versailles and Canadian Prime Minister Sir Robert Borden requested further investigation into the veracity of the story. At this time the German government formally requested that the Canadian government publicly acknowledge that the story of the crucified soldier was untrue, or else provide evidence. The official Canadian response to the Germans was that they had sufficient evidence to believe that the account was true, but when the Germans demanded a part in the investigation, the sculpture was withdrawn from the exhibition. It was not shown again until the 1990s.

A de facto government ban on exhibiting or even photographing the sculpture was in effect as late as 1989, when a request by Maria Tippett to include a photograph of it in an exhibition was denied. The statue was finally displayed again in 1992 in a Canadian War Museum exhibition, "Peace Is the Dream". The sculpture was also displayed in 2000 at an exhibition entitled "Under the Sign of the Cross: Creative Expressions of Christianity in Canada" at the Canadian Museum of Civilization in 2000, when the controversy was again commented upon.

== Bibliography ==
Notes

References

- Canadian War Museum (2019). "Relief sculpture, Canada's Golgotha - OBJECT NUMBER19710261-0797". Canadian War Museum.
- Evans, Suzanne (2007). Mothers of Heroes, Mothers of Martyrs: World War I and the Politics of Grief. McGill-Queen's Press. ISBN 9780773531888. - Total pages: 211
- Viereck, George Sylvester (1931). Spreading Germs of Hate. Duckworth. - Total pages: 327
