= Iain Overton =

British investigative journalist and author

- Born: 1973 (age 52–53)
- Education: Downing College, Cambridge, Gonville and Caius College, Cambridge
- Occupations: Journalist, writer and human rights activist
- Years active: 1995–present

Iain Overton (born 1973) is a British investigative journalist and the author of The Price of Paradise: How the Suicide Bomber Shaped the Modern World and Gun Baby Gun: A Bloody Journey into the World of the Gun.

He has been given the following awards for his journalism: a Peabody, a BAFTA Scotland, two Amnesty Awards, a Prix Circom, the Bar Council Best Journalist of the Year, and a One World Award. In addition, he has received nominations for three Royal Television Society Awards and a Golden Dagger Award.

Since 2025, Overton has led the MA Investigative and Human Rights Journalism pathway on the MA Global Journalism at SOAS University of London as an Associate Professor. There he teaches investigative reporting and war reporting.

In an 2026 interview, Overton claimed he has reported from around 80 countries and more than 25 conflict zones, covering armed conflict, organised crime and human rights abuses.

== Education ==
Overton read history at Downing College, Cambridge. From 1997 to 1998, he took an MPhil in international relations at Gonville and Caius College, Cambridge.

During his postgraduate studies he was taught by the historians Jay Winter and David Abulafia, whom he later cited as important influences on his work. In a 2026 interview with his college, Overton said that his MPhil dissertation on the "Crucified Soldier" legend led to the commissioning of a Channel 4 documentary, helping to establish his career in investigative journalism and documentary filmmaking.

== The Crucified Soldier ==
The Crucified Soldier refers to the widespread story of an Allied soldier serving in the Canadian Corps who may have been crucified with bayonets on a barn door or a tree. During World War II the story was used by the Nazis as an example of British propaganda.

Iain Overton investigated the story of the Crucified Soldier as well as other myths of World War I in his MPhil dissertation and developed them into a television documentary, which was transmitted in 2002 as part of UK Channel 4's Secret History series. Overton uncovered new historical evidence which identified the crucified soldier as Sergeant Harry Band of the Central Ontario Regiment of the Canadian Infantry, who was reported missing in action on 24 April 1915 near Ypres. Other soldiers in his unit wrote to Band's sister Elizabeth Petrie to express their condolences; a year later, one of them finally confirmed in a letter to her that her suspicions her brother had been "the crucified soldier" were true. Band's body was never recovered, and he is commemorated on the Menin Gate memorial.

The evidence discovered by Overton included a typewritten note by a British nurse found in the Liddle Collection of war correspondence in Leeds University. The note related comments by a Lance Corporal C.M. Brown to his nurse, Miss Ursula Violet Chaloner, who he told of a Sergeant Harry Band who was "crucified after a battle of Ypres on one of the doors of a barn with five bayonets in him."

== Broadcast journalism ==
In 2004 Overton won a BAFTA Scotland for the exposé Security Wars, a BBC film highlighting corruption in the security industry in Scotland. In 2005 he won a Peabody Award for a BBC report on counterfeiting in the pharmaceutical industry.

In that year he was also a producer on the series that won, with reporter Simon Reeve, a One World Award for best popular feature for the series Places That Don't Exist for the BBC. In August 2005 he was appointed an Executive Producer at ITN.

In 2006 he was voted best Broadcast Journalist by the UK bar council for a news report on the proposed changes to the coroners' system, which would have made coroners' investigations into deaths abroad discretionary rather than compulsory.

== The Bureau of Investigative Journalism ==
In September 2009, Overton was appointed the first managing editor of the Bureau of Investigative Journalism.

In this role he oversaw many award-winning investigations, including the Wikileaks Iraq War Logs. In 2010/2011, under his editorship, the Bureau won an Amnesty Award, a Thomson Reuters Award and was shortlisted for an IRE award for its reporting. In 2011/2012 the Bureau won a second Amnesty Award and was nominated for four Press Gazette British Journalism Awards.

Overton resigned from his role at the Bureau of Investigative Journalism in the wake of the scandal. Overton had agreed to the secondment of a member of his staff to the BBC to produce a Newsnight report with no editorial control over the story. However, on 2 November 2012, despite such lack of involvement Overton tweeted: 'If all goes well we've got a Newsnight out tonight about a very senior political figure who is a paedophile.'

The BBC TV programme Newsnight broadcast, shown on 2 November 2012 and reported by the Bureau of Investigative Journalism's lead journalist Angus Stickler made an allegation against an unnamed politician, who was widely identified on the internet as the former Conservative Party Treasurer Lord McAlpine. Lord McAlpine issued a statement strongly denying the accusations. This allegation was subsequently admitted to be false.

Regarding Overton's role in the story, the Trustees of the BIJ concluded that "The Trustees consider that he (Overton) made a serious error of judgment, and risked the reputation of the Bureau, when he tweeted about the programme on the day of its transmission, both by exaggerating the Bureau's role in the story and by releasing information (that was itself wrong) prematurely."

In November 2012, eight members of parliament supported an Early day motion, tabled by Paul Flynn MP, praising the stories reported at the Bureau under Iain Overton's editorship.

== Action on Armed Violence ==
From 2012, Iain Overton became the executive director of the London-based charity Action on Armed Violence (AOAV).

He is an expert member on the Forum for the Arms Trade.

== Gun Baby Gun: A Bloody Journey into the World of the Gun ==
Gun, Baby Gun: A Bloody Journey into the World of the Gun was published by Canongate in 2015.

The Spectator said it was "relentlessly engrossing". The Independent said it was a "riveting book...enough to make your jaw drop... without judgement, refusing to descend into anti-gun rhetoric." The Financial Times described it as "adventurous, ambitiously tracing the often devastating impact of guns around the world."

Gun Baby Gun was shortlisted for the 2015 Crime Writer's Association Dagger Awards in the non-fiction category.

== The Price of Paradise: How the Suicide Bomber Shaped the Modern World ==
Overton's second book - The Price of Paradise: How the Suicide Bomber Shaped the Modern World - came out in April 2019. In 2020, The Price of Paradise was nominated by the Airey Neave Trust for the Neave Book Prize 2019/20.

Christina Lamb reviewed it as "fascinating... a must-read" in the Sunday Times.

Anthony Loyd reviewed it as "outstanding... the author takes confident control over this huge, dense and dark subject... Engrossing" in the New Statesman.
