= Statue of John Henry Newman, London =

Statue outside the Brompton Oratory, London

Statue of John Henry Newman
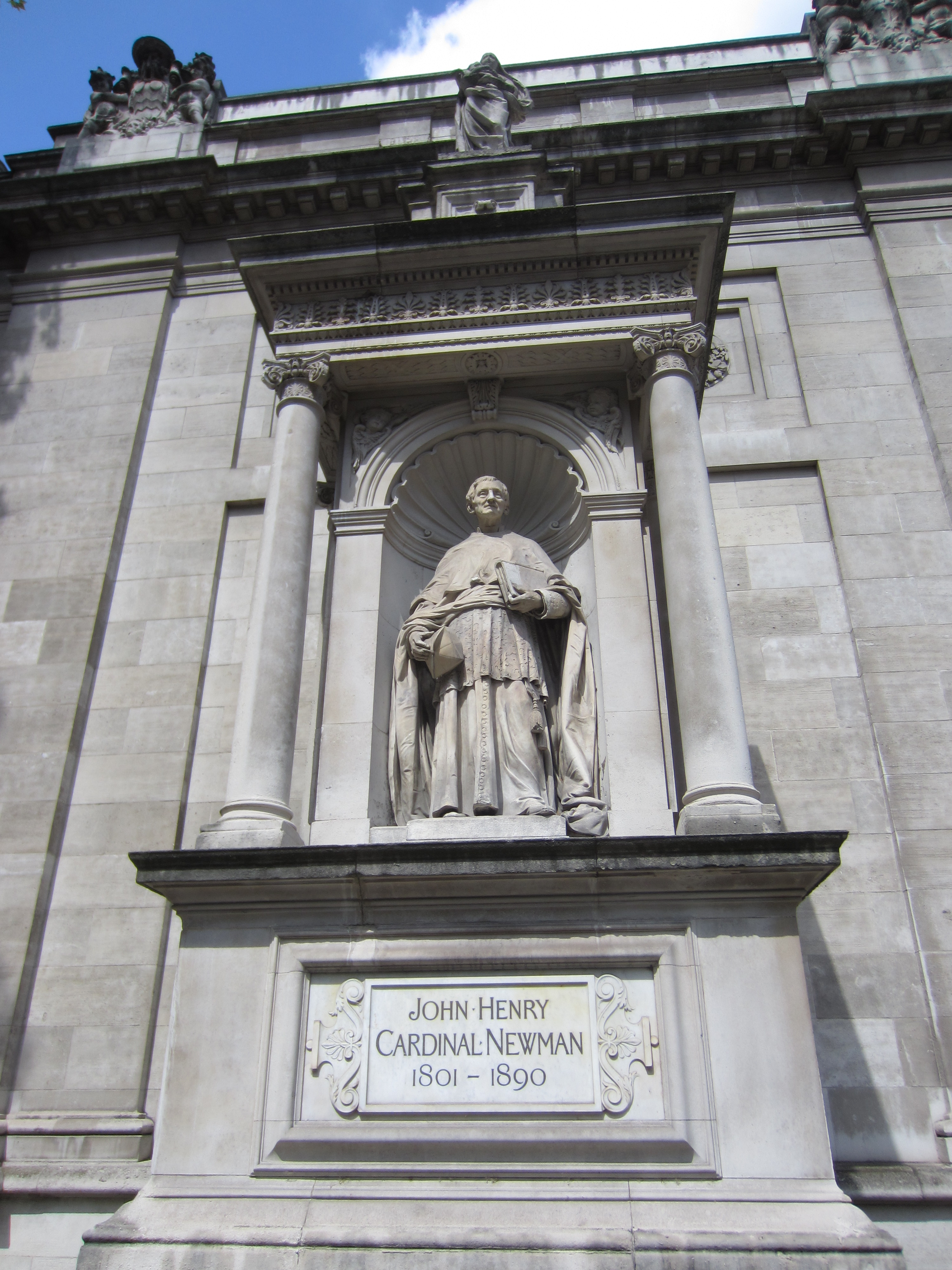
- The statue in 2014
- Artist: Léon-Joseph Chavalliaud
- Subject: John Henry Newman
- Location: London, United Kingdom; 51.4965°N 0.1702°W

The statue of John Henry Newman is an outdoor sculpture of the English cardinal, oratorian, and theologian of the same name by Léon-Joseph Chavalliaud, installed outside Brompton Oratory in London, United Kingdom.

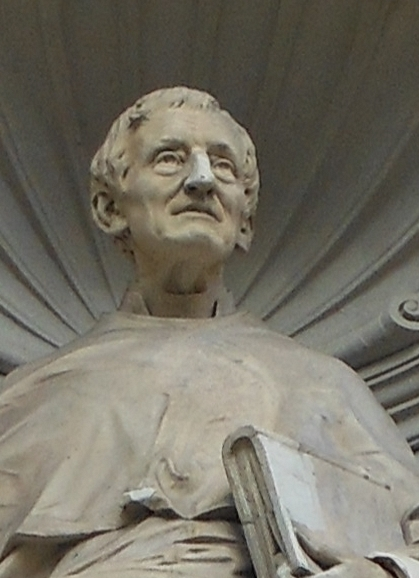
Detail
