= Francis Derwent Wood =

British sculptor (1871–1926)

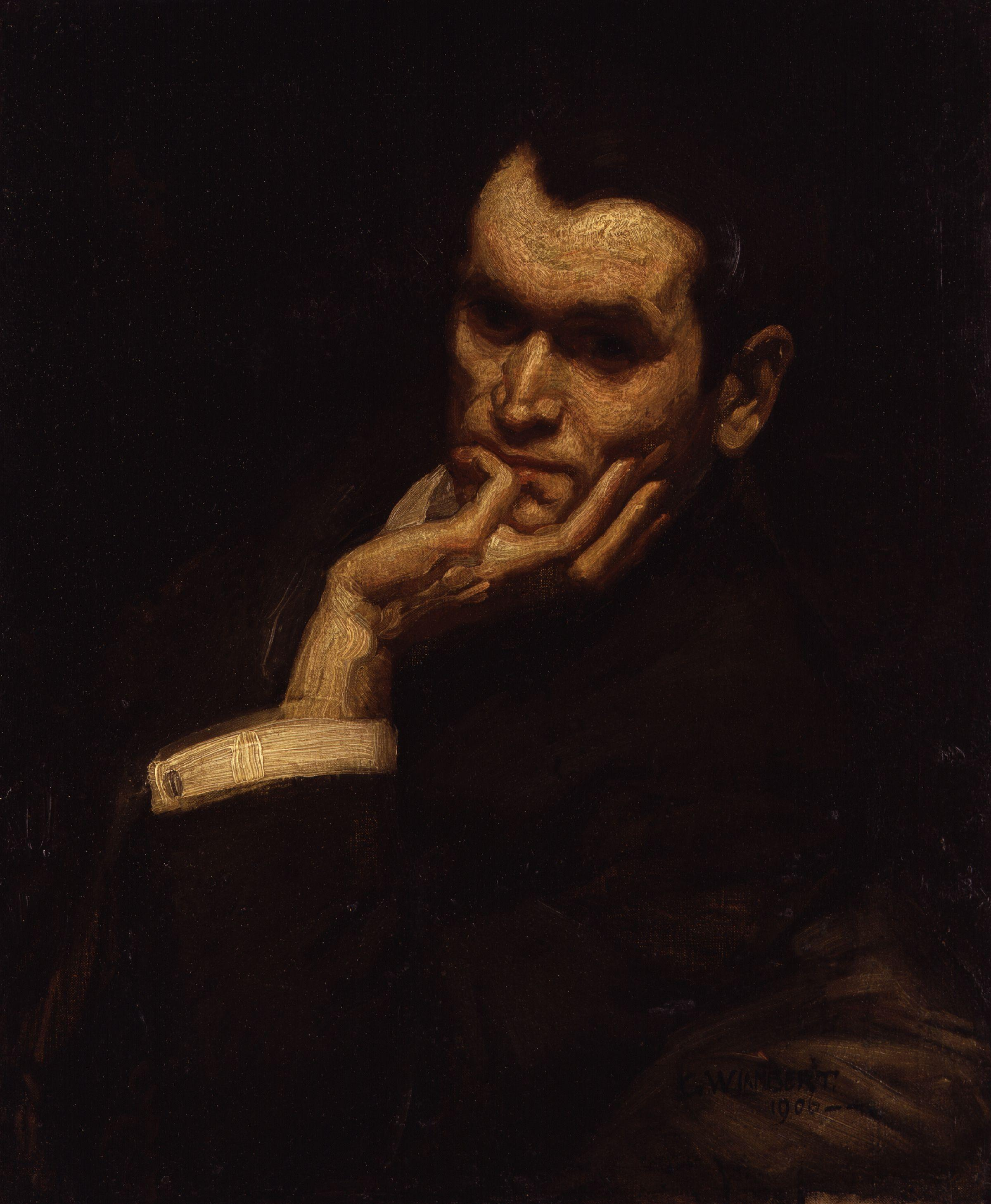
- A 1906 portrait of Wood by George Washington Lambert
- Born: 15 October 1871; Keswick, Cumbria, England
- Died: 19 February 1926 (aged 54); London, England
- Occupation: Sculptor
- Spouse: Florence Mary Schmidt (m. 1903)

Francis Derwent Wood RA (15 October 1871– 19 February 1926) was a British sculptor.

== Biography ==
=== Early life ===
Wood was born at Keswick in Cumbria and studied in Germany and returned to London in 1887 to work under Édouard Lantéri and Sir Thomas Brock; he taught at the Glasgow School of Art from 1897 through to 1905. He produced a good deal of architectural sculpture typical of the time, including four large roof figures for the Kelvingrove Art Gallery and Museum in Glasgow, the British Linen Bank also in Glasgow, and the Britannic House in London for architect Sir Edwin Lutyens. Freestanding sculptures by him may also be seen in various locations, such as his 1909 Atalanta (Manchester Art Gallery), with a bronze cast of it now in Chelsea Embankment Gardens),

=== World War One ===
As the onset of the First World War, Wood was too old (at 41), for active duty and enlisted as a private in the Royal Army Medical Corps, in which he served as an orderly with his photographer friend Ward Muir. He worked as an orderly in hospital wards, and his exposure to the gruesome injuries inflicted by the new war's weapons eventually led him to open a special clinic: the Masks for Facial Disfigurement Department, located in the Third London General Hospital, Wandsworth. Instead of the rubber masks used conventionally, Wood constructed masks of thin metal, sculpted to match the portraits of the men in their pre-war normality. Just as had been happening with soldiers operated upon with the recent advances in plastic surgery, Wood's masks provided each with a renewed self-confidence, even self-respect, though they often proved uncomfortable. Face wounds were known to be the most devastating. By hiding the wounds behind the mask, the young men were able to return to relationships with their families and friends.

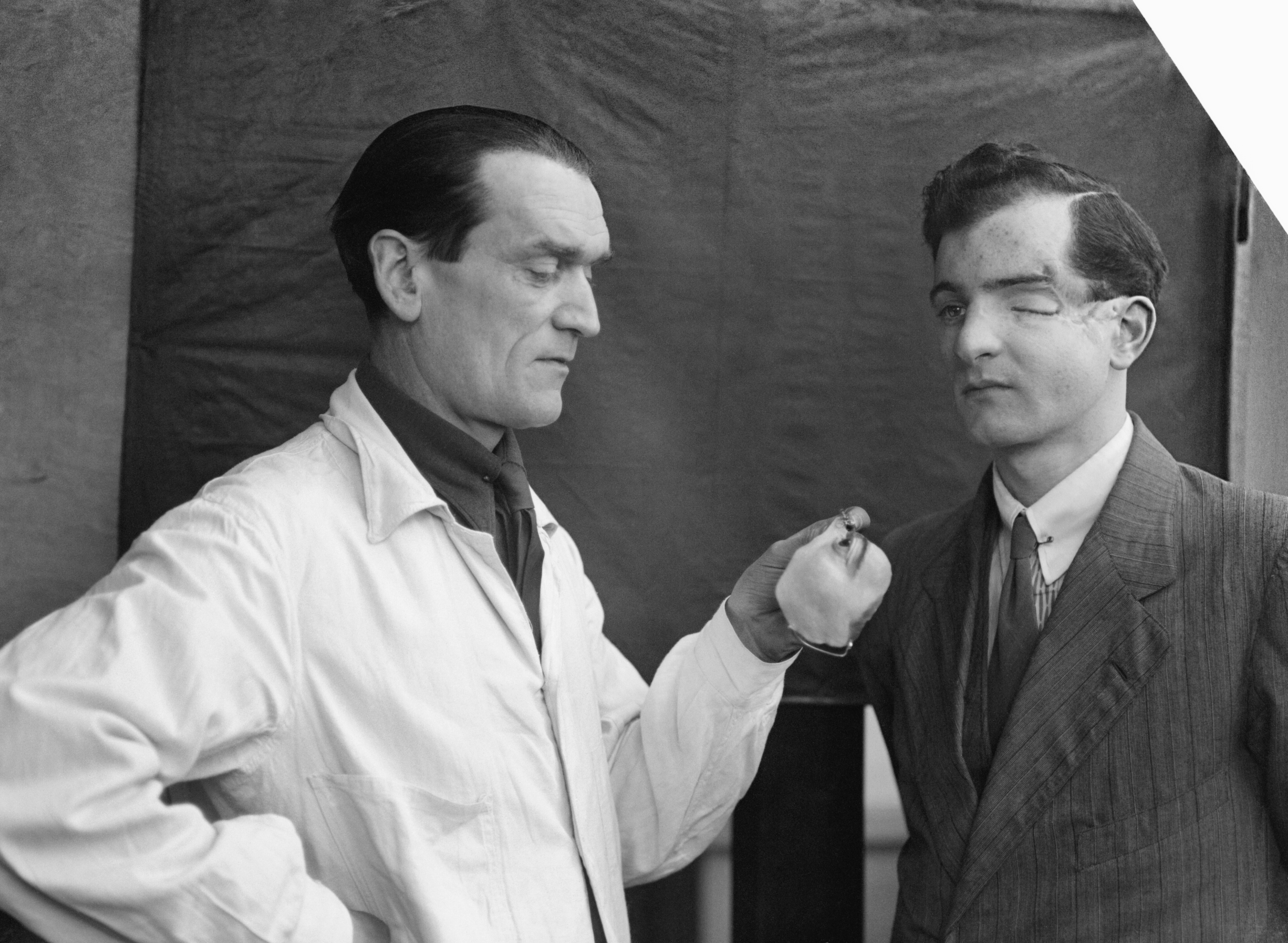
Francis Derwent Wood checking a mask for a patient during World War 1

Each mask required many weeks of work on the part of Woods, and other surgeons who followed his lead. A plaster cast was taken of the subject's wounded face – but only after the wounds and subsequent surgeries had totally healed. The crude process was itself a trial. The plaster cast was used to make a squeeze of plastocene or clay. This disfigured bust was used as the foundation of all prosthetic restorative work, with the sculptor working to replace the missing components of the face with the shapes from the opposing side. The mask itself was made from a thin copper sheet – galvanized copper to facilitate painting after forming. Painting a realistic portrait onto the copper mask was as challenging as the sculpting: each was finished while the patient wore it, in order to most accurately match the tone of the flesh with the enamels.

The ward stayed open only two years, from 1917 to 1919. There is no record of the exact number of masks made, but it must have been several hundred: a tiny drop among the more than 20,000 wounded in the face. His earnest efforts may not have helped statistically, but they influenced the lives of those he helped dramatically.

=== Post-war ===
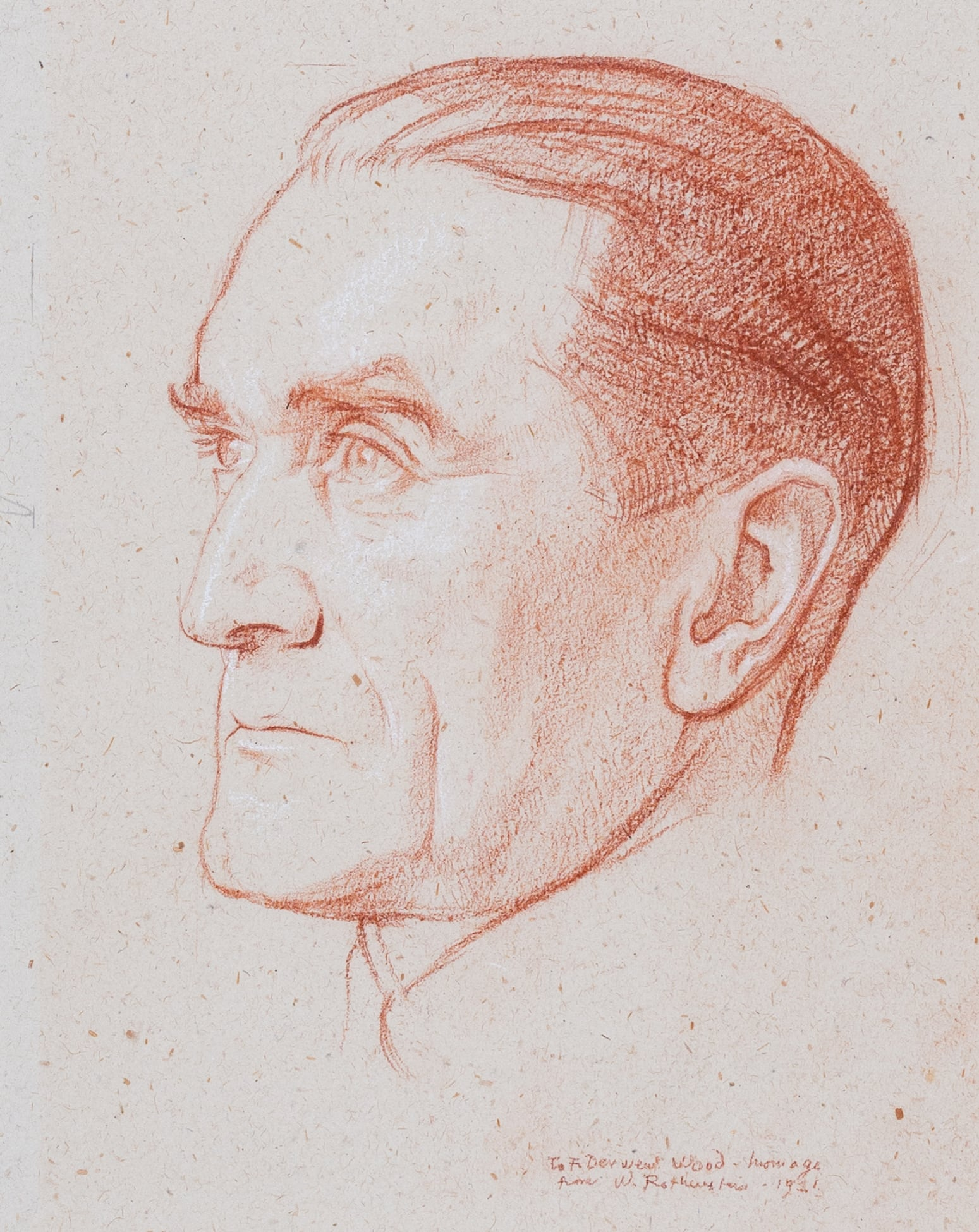
Chalk drawing by William Rothenstein, inscribed 'To F Derwent Wood – Homage from W Rothenstein, 1921'

Wood was professor of sculpture at the Royal College of Art from 1918 through to 1923, with William Rothenstein as Principal.

He produced a representation of The Crucified Soldier called Canada's Golgotha in 1919, which caused a diplomatic flap between the Canadian and German governments. His Machine Gun Corps Memorial at Hyde Park Corner was also controversial.

He was elected to the Royal Academy in 1920.

=== Personal life ===
Wood married Florence Mary Schmidt (1873–1969) in early 1903. Wood died in London in 1926 at the age of fifty-five. His grave can be found at St Michael's Church, Amberley, West Sussex, with that of his wife.

== Selected public works ==
Image	Title / subject	Location and coordinates	Date	Type	Material	Dimensions	Designation	Wikidata	Notes
More images	Daedalus Equipping Icarus	Bristol Museum & Art Gallery	1895	Sculpture group	Bronze				
	Music, Architecture, Painting and Sculpture	Facade of Kelvingrove Art Gallery and Museum, Glasow	1898	Four architectural sculptures	Stone				
More images	Sir Titus Salt	Roberts Park, Saltaire, West Yorkshire	1903	Statue on pedestal	Bronze & stone		Grade II	Q26426353	
	Charles Henry Wilson, 1st Baron Nunburnholme	Kingston upon Hull, Yorkshire	c. 1907	Statue on pedestal	Portland stone		Grade II	Q26584663	
More images	Psyche	Victoria and Albert Museum	1908-19	Statue	Bronze	175 cm high			The Lady Lever Art Gallery also has a casting of the work.
More images	General James Wolfe	The Green, Westerham, Kent	1911	Statue on pedestal	Bronze and Portland stone		Grade II*	Q17545629	
	George Robinson, 1st Marquess of Ripon	Spa Gardens, Ripon, Yorkshire	1912	Statue on pedestal	Bronze & stone		Grade II	Q26601856	
More images	Ambrose McEvoy	National Portrait Gallery, London	1915	Bust	Bronze	440 x 260mm			
	George Robinson, 1st Marquess of Ripon	Gardens of Victoria Memorial, Kolkata	1915	Statue on pedestal	Bronze & stone				
	George Robinson, 1st Marquess of Ripon	Ripon Building, Chennai	1915	Statue on pedestal	Bronze & stone				
	Sir Pherozeshah Mehta	Outside Municipal Corporation Building, Mumbai	c. 1916	Statue on pedestal	Bronze & stone				
	Canada's Golgotha	Canadian War Museum, Ottawa	1918	Relief sculpture	Bronze	0.8m tall			
	Australia Gate	Approach to Buckingham Palace, London	1920	Two statues on pillars	Stone				
More images	Indian Water Carrier, Woman with baby, Britannia & Persian Scarf Dancer	Britannic House, Finsbury Circus, London	1920	Architectural sculptures	Stone				Architect, Sir.E.L. Lutyens
	War memorial	St Mary's, Ditchingham, Norfolk	1920	Effigy & panels	Bronze & black marble		Grade I	Q17537511	
	Humanity overcoming War	Cartwright Hall, Bradford	1921	Sculpture group	Marble				
	Sir Henry Royce	Riverside Gardens, Derby	1921	Statue on pedestal	Bronze & stone		Grade II		Restored & relocated 1990
More images	Liverpool Cotton Association war memorial	Exchange Flags, Walker House, Liverpool	1922	Statue	Bronze		Grade II	Q66478442	Unveiled 1922, relocated 2011
More images	War memorial	Keswick, Cumbria	1922	Cenotaph with plaques	Stone & bronze		Grade II	Q66477925	
More images	Machine Gun Corps Memorial	Hyde Park Corner, London	1925	Statue on pedestal with surround	Bronze, marble & Portland stone		Grade II*	Q6723658	
	Memorial to Major General Sir John Eardley Wilmot Inglis	The Nelson Chamber, Crypt of St Paul's Cathedral, London		Medallion & relief tablet	Bronze & marble				
	Atalanta, Memorial to Derwent Wood	Chelsea Embankment, London	1929	Statue	Bronze		Grade II		After the marble original of 1909 held by Manchester Art Gallery

== Other works ==
- The Penitent Thief, 1918, bronze head of one of the two thieves crucified alongside Jesus Christ, held at Lady Lever Art Gallery, Port Sunlight
- Derwent Wood modelled, 1897–1900, the figures of the Ship's Prow and Zephyrs which adorned the British Linen Company Bank building in Govan Road, Glasgow.
- Statue of Queen Victoria, bronze, 1903, now in the museum at Sheesh Mahal in Patiala
- 1912 bronze statue of Edward VII in the uniform of a royal field marshal, now in the museum at Sheesh Mahal in Patiala
- Statue, in bronze, of Herbert Kitchener, 1st Earl Kitchener, c. 1920, originally erected in Kolkata, then moved to the Kitchener Military College and when that closed erected in the courtyard of the Dhubela Museum in Madhya Pradesh
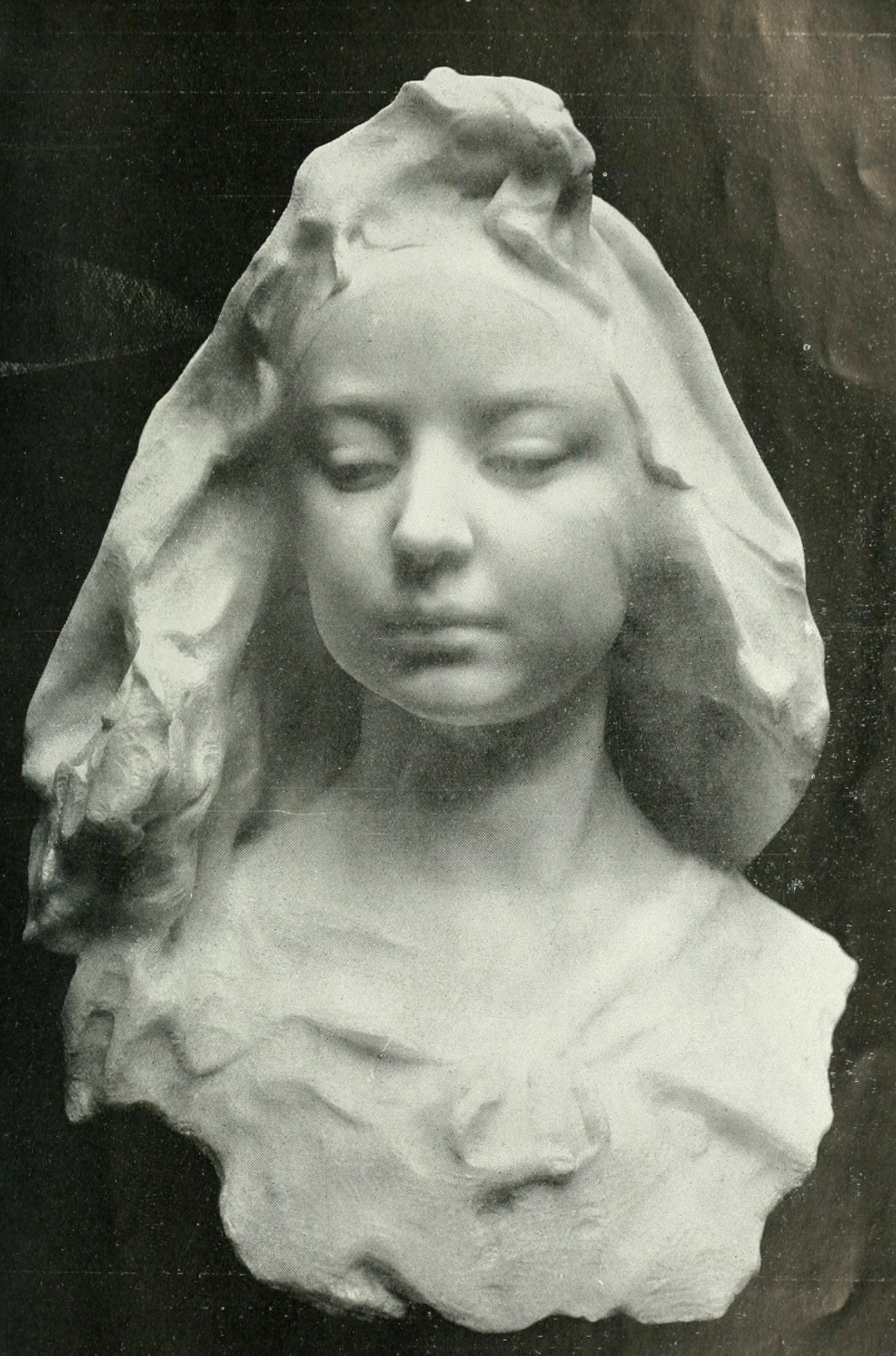
Derwent Wood's Maggie.

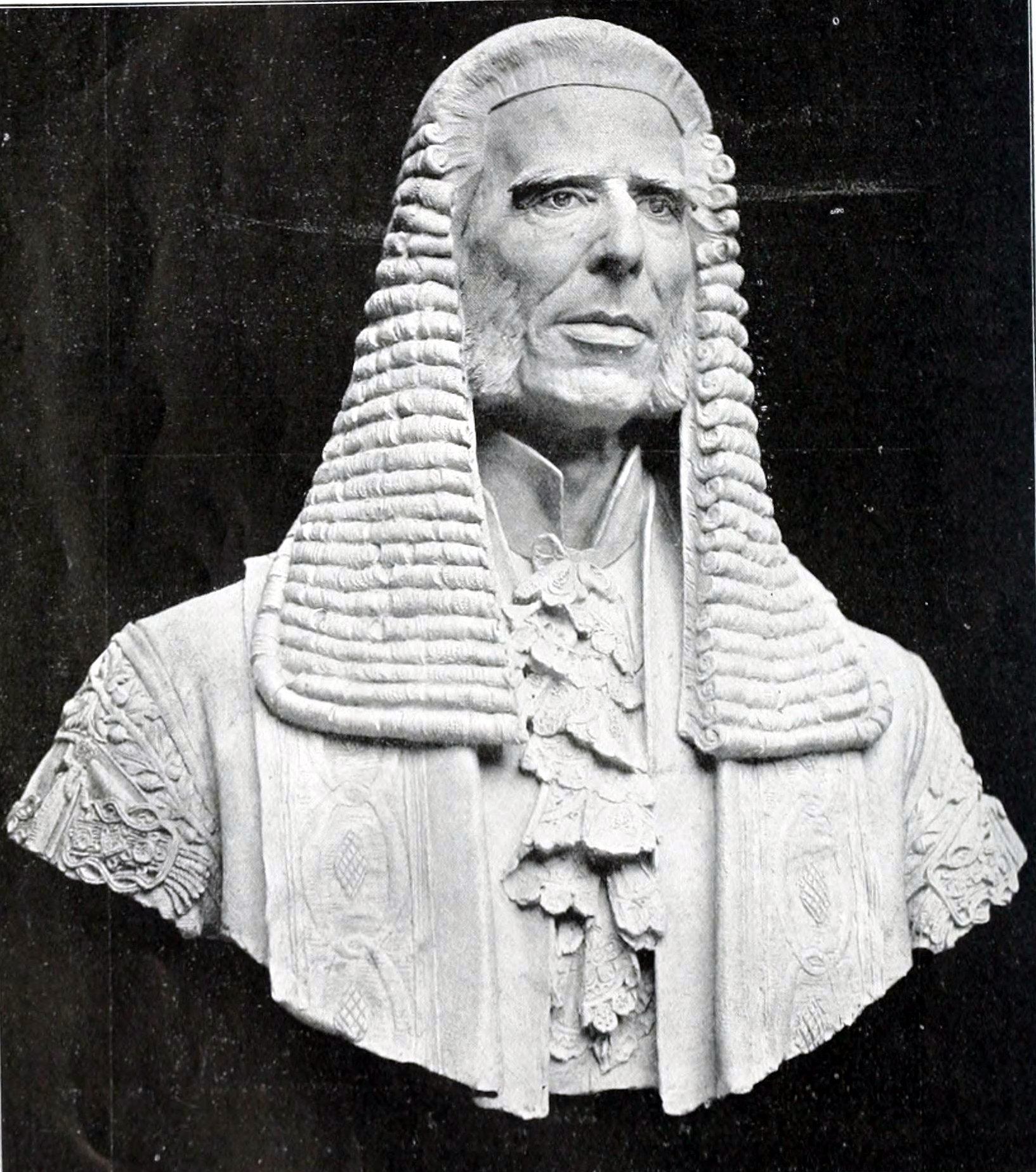
Derwent Wood's Lord Henn-Collins

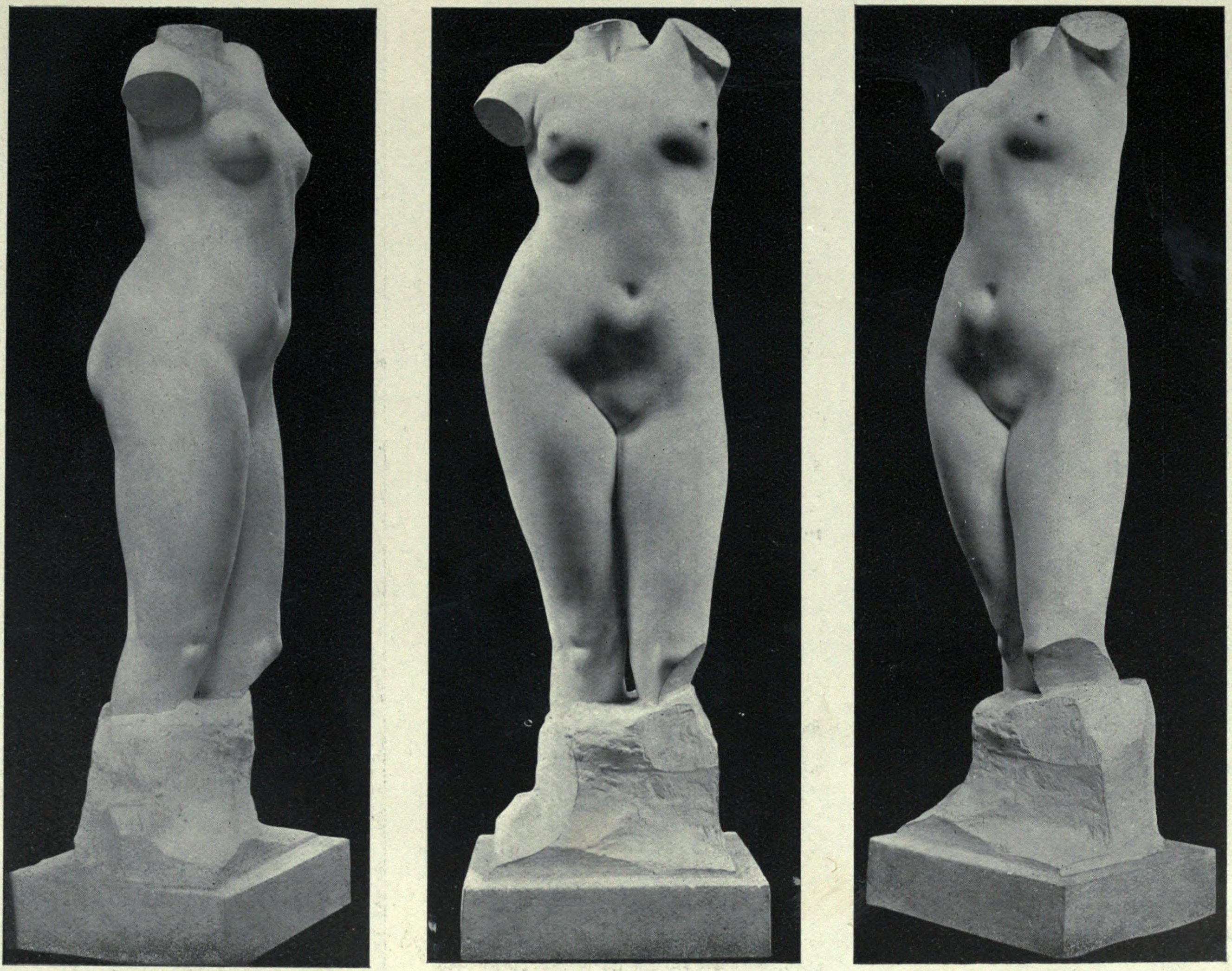
Derwent Wood's female nude

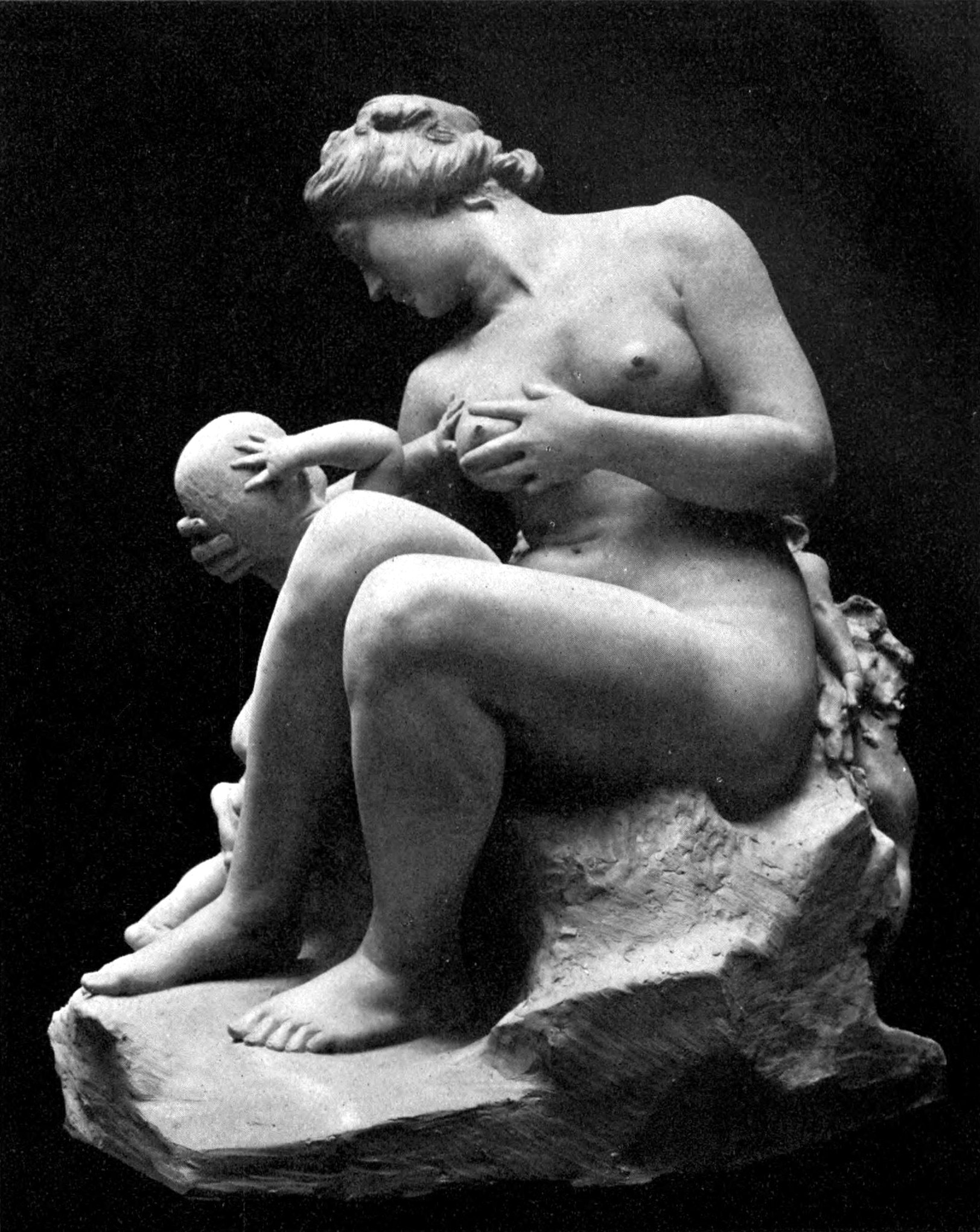
Derwent Wood's Abondance

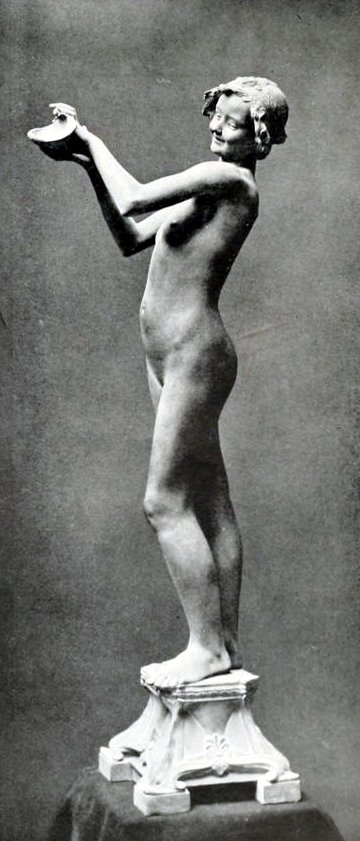
Derwent Wood's Female nude

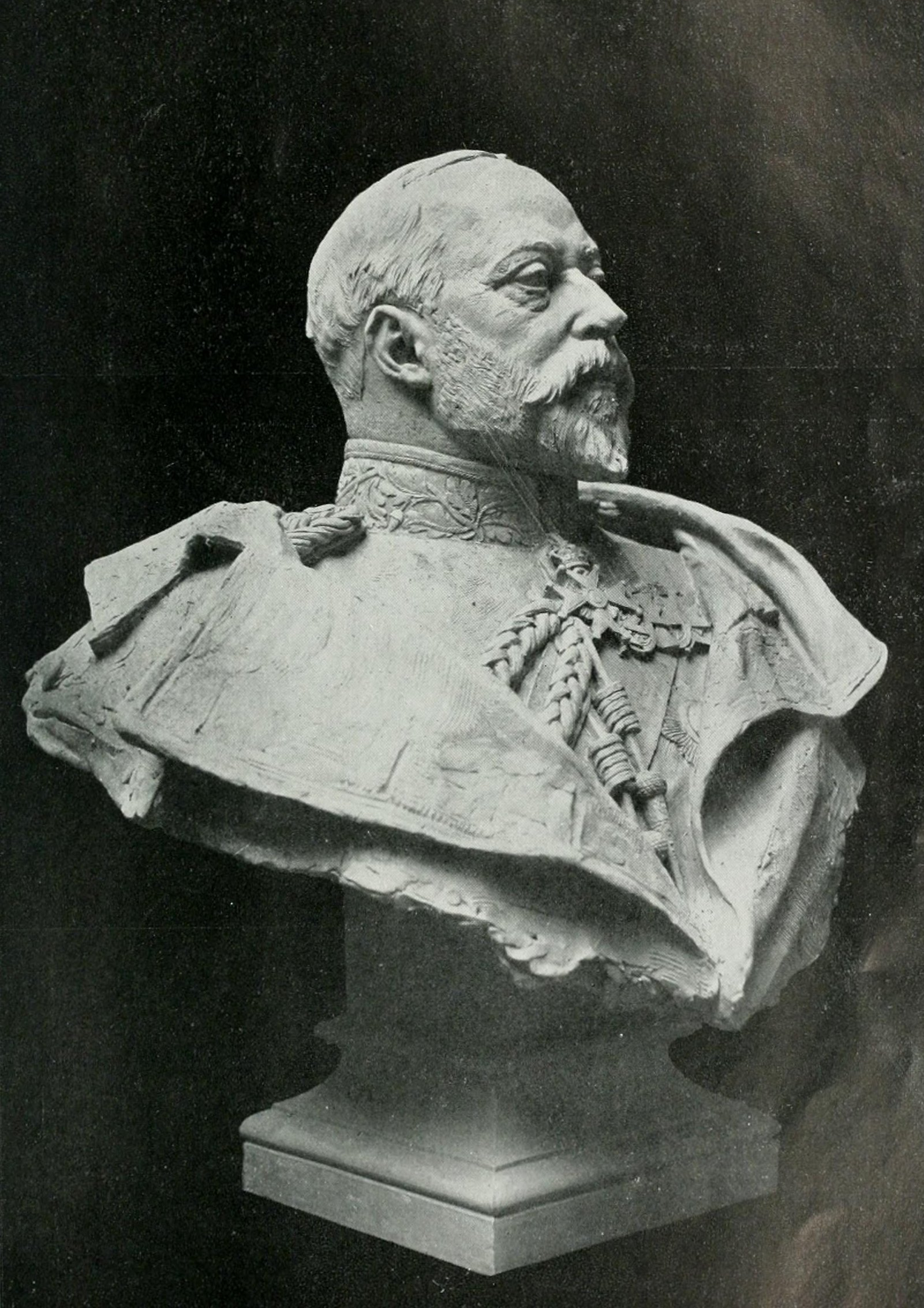
Derwent Wood's bust of Edward VII

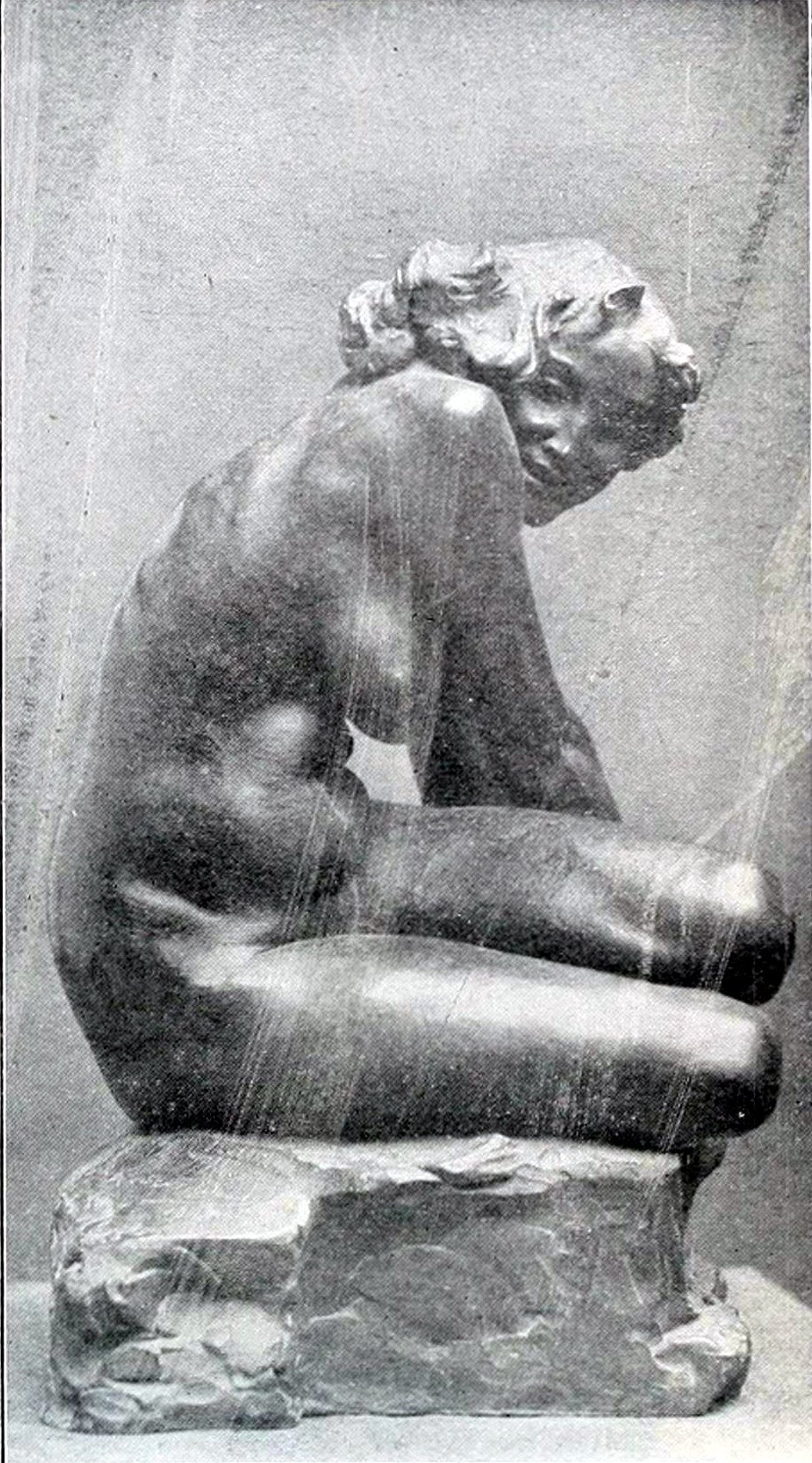
Derwent Wood's La Baigneuse

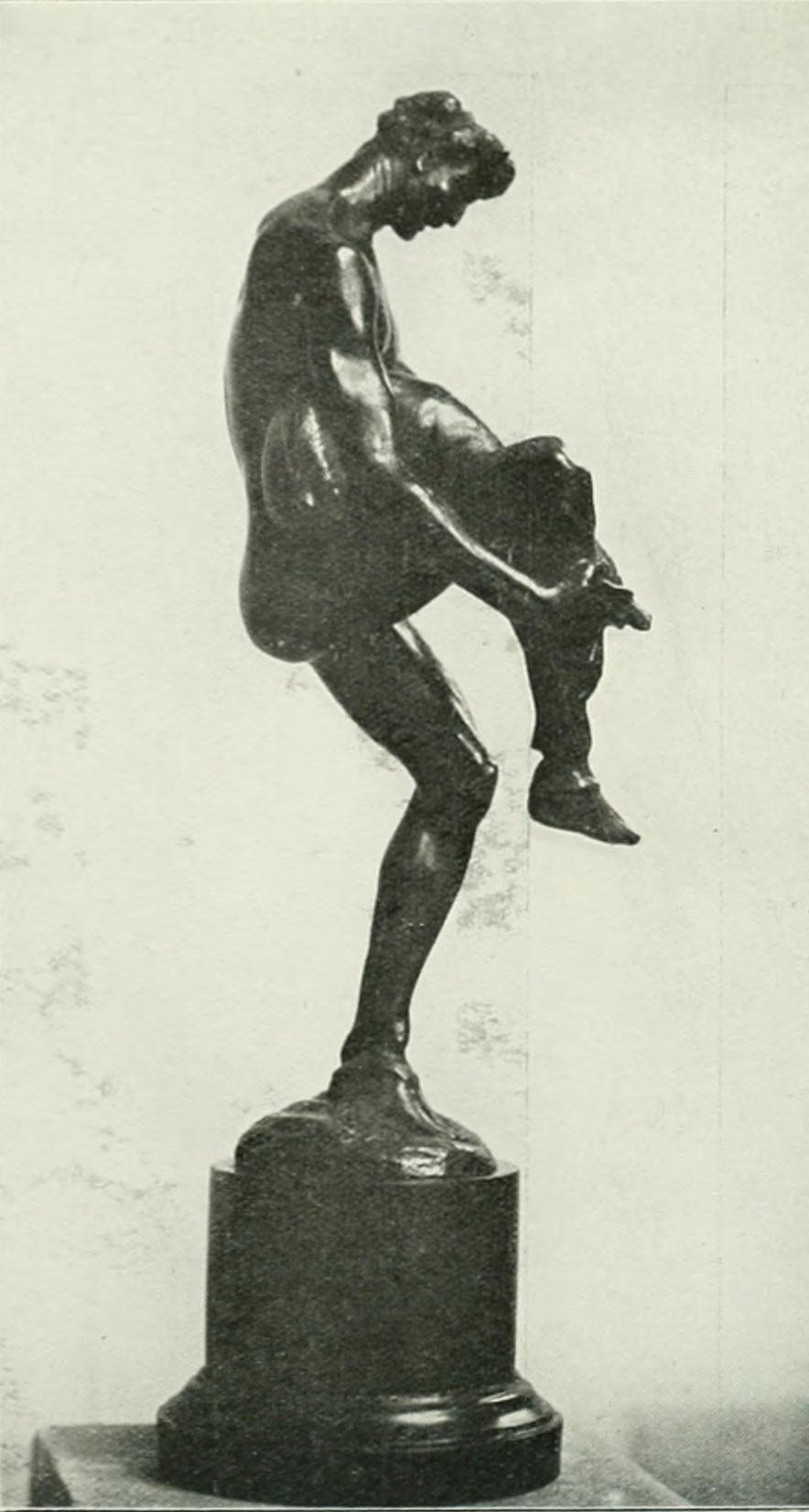
Derwent Wood's Faune et outre

== See also ==
- Anna Coleman Ladd, another sculptor making masks for soldiers disfigured in World War I
