= Atalanta (sculpture) =

Statue by Francis Derwent Wood

Coordinates: 51.4832°N 0.1676°W

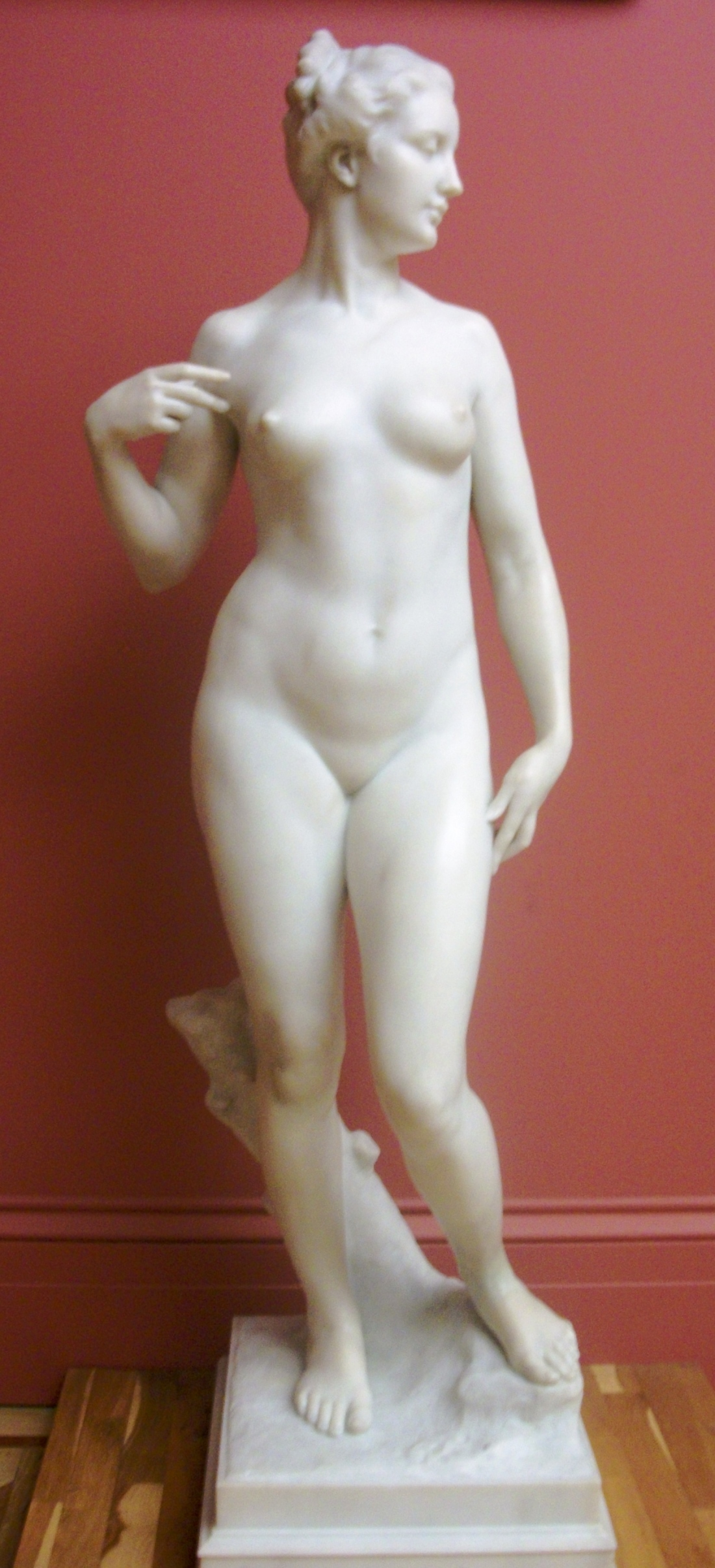
Marble sculpture, 1909, Manchester Art Gallery

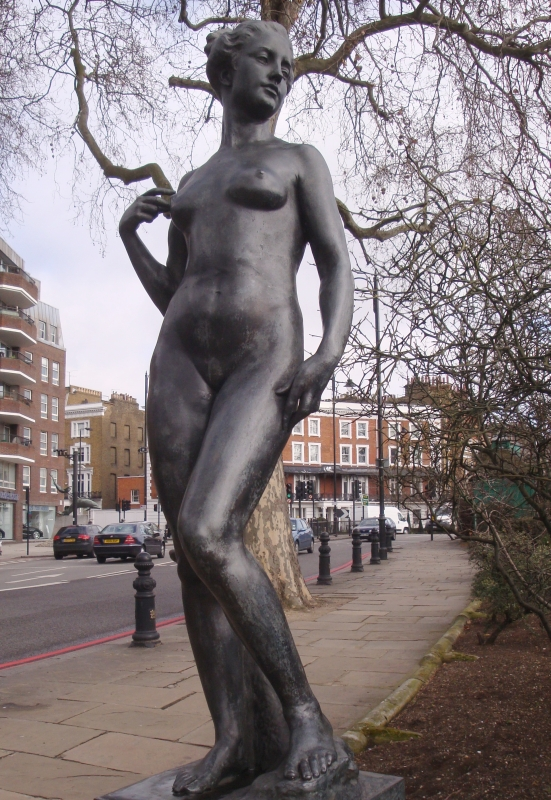
Bronze sculpture, 1929, Chelsea Embankment Gardens

Atalanta is a statue by the British sculptor Francis Derwent Wood. It shows a naked woman standing in a contrapposto position, glancing to her left, with her left hand by her side and right hand raised to her shoulder. The subject is Atalanta, a virgin huntress from Greek mythology; she may be preparing for the foot race she used as an obstacle to prevent suitors securing a marriage.

There are three main versions: a plaster version exhibited at the Royal Academy in 1907; a marble version 175 centimetres (69 in) high exhibited at the academy in 1909 and presented to Manchester Art Gallery by the National Art Collections Fund in 1919; and a bronze casting which was erected by friends of the sculptor from Chelsea Arts Club at Chelsea Embankment Gardens, to the west side of Albert Bridge, in 1929, three years after Wood's death.

The bronze statue in London received a Grade II listing in 1969. The original casting was stolen in 1991 and replaced by a replica. Nearby are David Wynne's Boy with a Dolphin and Edward Bainbridge Copnall 1971 statue of David, a copy of the sculpture by Wood atop the Machine Gun Corps Memorial.
