= Statue of Thomas Carlyle =

Statue in London

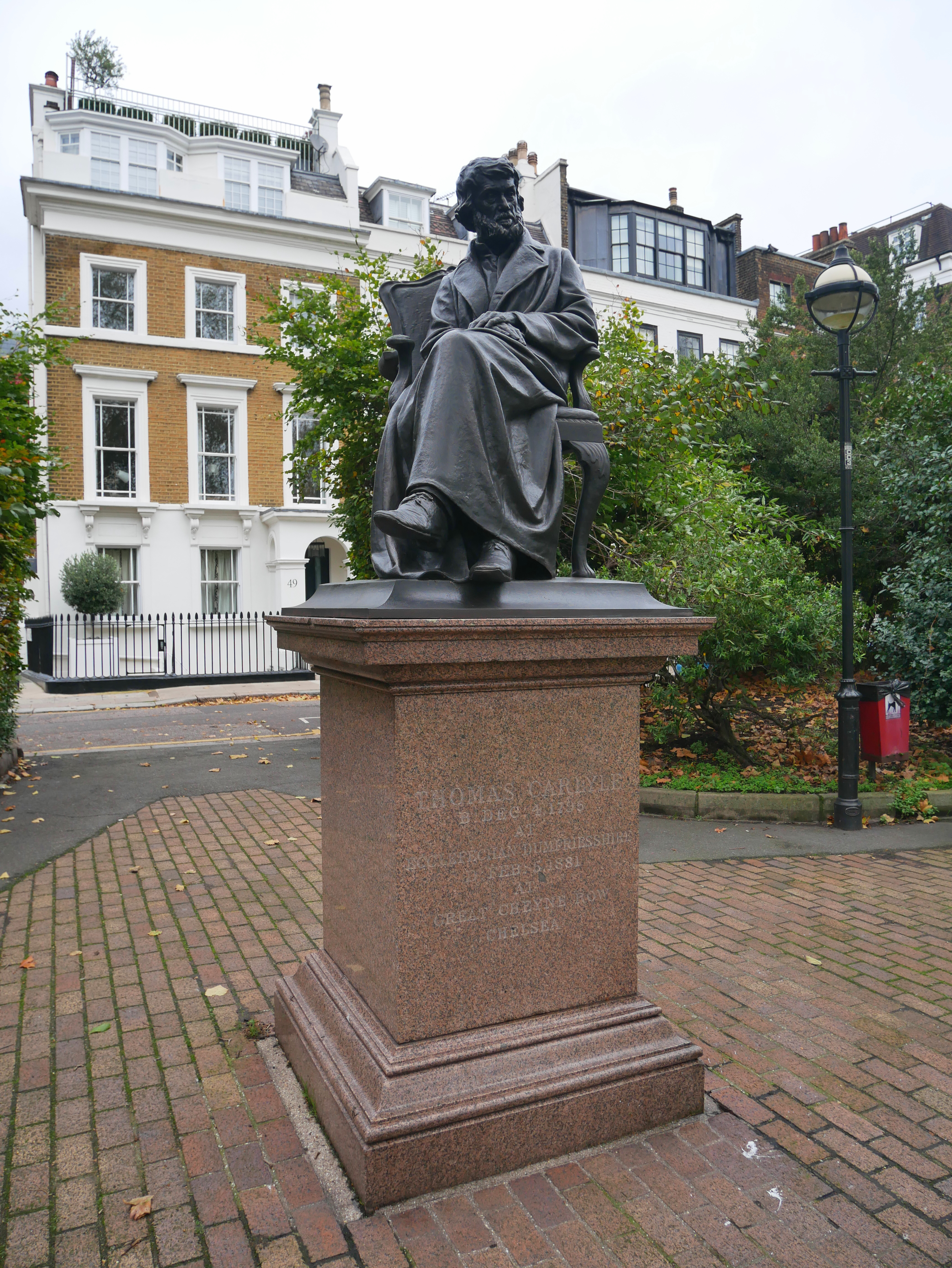
- As it appeared in 2020
- Artist: Joseph Edgar Boehm
- Medium: Bronze and red granite
- Subject: Thomas Carlyle
- Location: London, England; 51°29′00″N 0°10′09″W

Listed Building – Grade II
- Official name: Statue of Thomas Carlyle, Embankment Gardens, Chelsea Embankment SW3
- Designated: 15 April 1969
- Reference no.: 1080715

A Statue of Thomas Carlyle by Joseph Edgar Boehm stands in Chelsea Embankment Gardens in London. Erected in 1881 and unveiled in 1882, it stands close to 24 Cheyne Row where Carlyle lived for the last 47 years of his life. The statue became a Grade II listed building on 15 April 1969.

== History ==
=== Production and reception ===
Boehm had executed a statuette in plaster of Carlyle in April 1874 at the request of Lady Harriet Mary Montagu. Carlyle liked it and decided to sit for Boehm in the beginning of 1875, in order to produce a large marble version which now resides in the National Galleries of Scotland. At the first sitting, Carlyle announced brusquely, "storming in at the door in the guise of one of his own northern gales": "I'll give you twenty-two minutes to make what you can of me." When Boehm punctually finished working, Carlyle was delighted enough to give him another twenty-two minutes, subsequently sitting often, writing: "He seems to me by far the cleverest Sculptor or Artist I have ever seen." Boehm also produced a cast of Carlyle's hands and a bust. John Tyndall spoke at the unveiling of the bronze in 1882. The marble was presented by Archibald Primrose, 5th Earl of Rosebery in 1916.

Boehm said it was "the best thing I ever did". James Anthony Froude considered it "as satisfactory a likeness in face and figure as could be rendered in sculpture". John Ruskin described it as "a noble piece of portraiture" with "high and harmonious measures in which it seems to me to express the mind and features of my dear Master." He continued:

here is a piece of vital and essential sculpture; the result of sincere skill spent carefully on an object worthy its care; motive and method alike right; no pains spared, and none wasted. And any spectator of sensitiveness will find that, broadly speaking, all the sculpture round seems dead and heavy in comparison, after he has looked long at this.

James Caw later called it "one of the most virile and remarkable of modern portrait-statues."

=== Replica ===
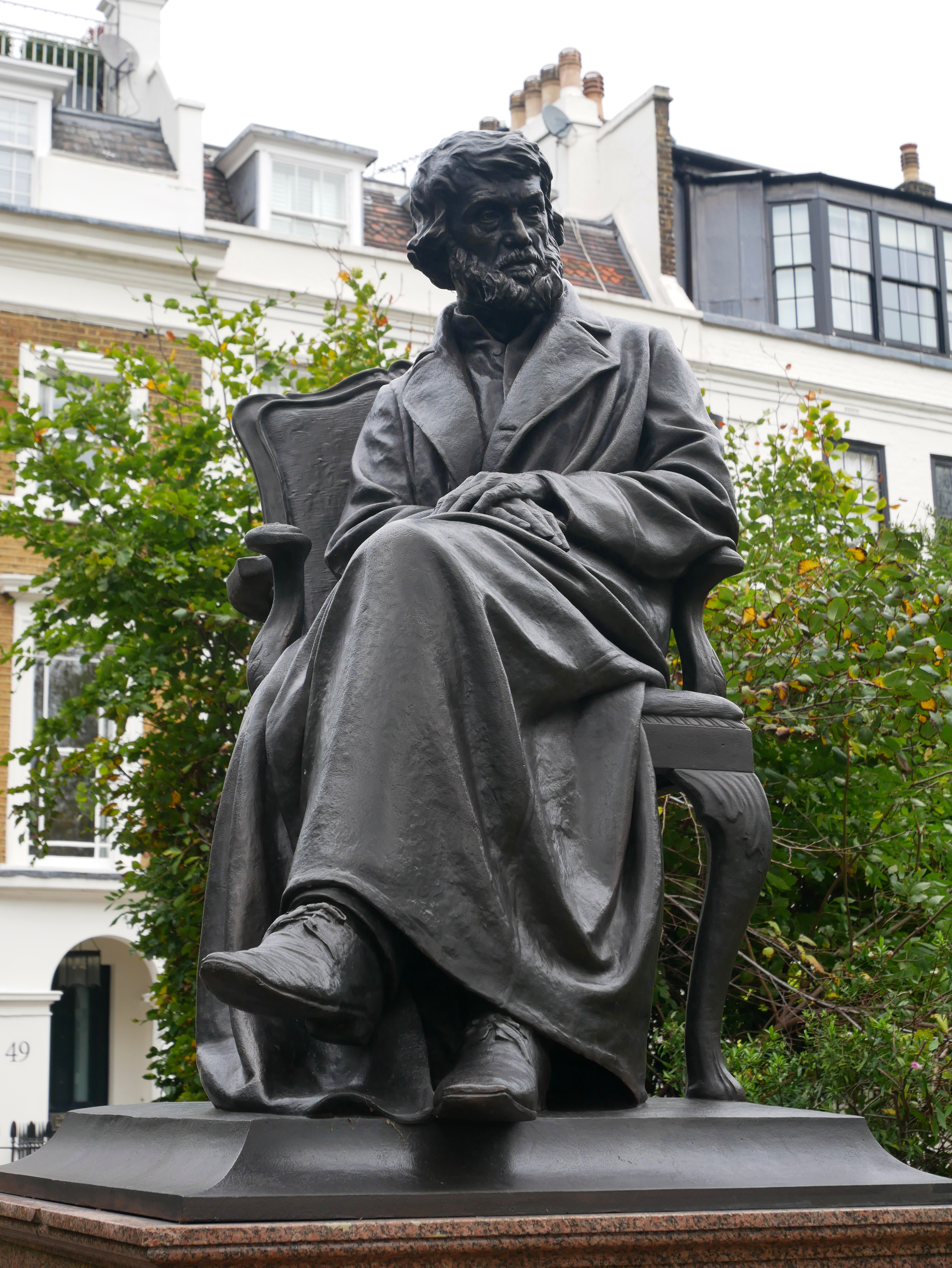
Detail of the statue

A replica of the bronze by MacDonald and Creswick, itself a Category B listed building, was given to Ecclefechan, Carlyle's place of birth and burial, by Alexander Carlyle, husband of Mary Carlyle Aitken, the writer's niece, and unveiled on 3 September 1929 by the writer's granddaughter Betty Carlyle in the presence of 7,000 spectators. Sir James Crichton-Browne delivered an address, transcribed in the 11 October 1929 issue of The Advertiser. He referred to Carlyle as not merely "a great master of literature" but "our supreme historian", "an earnest social reformer", and, "in short, a man of genius of the colossal type".

== Gallery ==
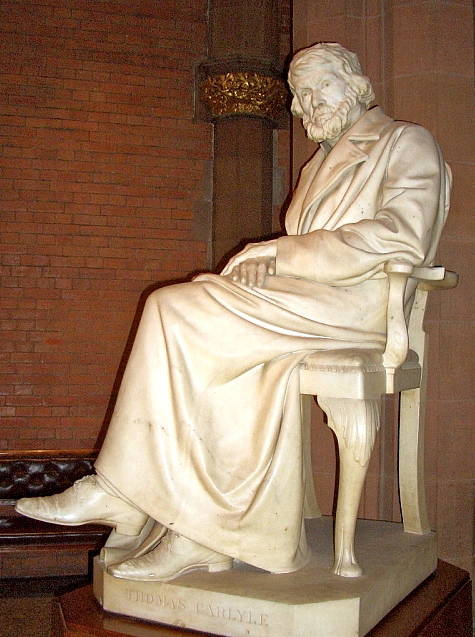
Marble

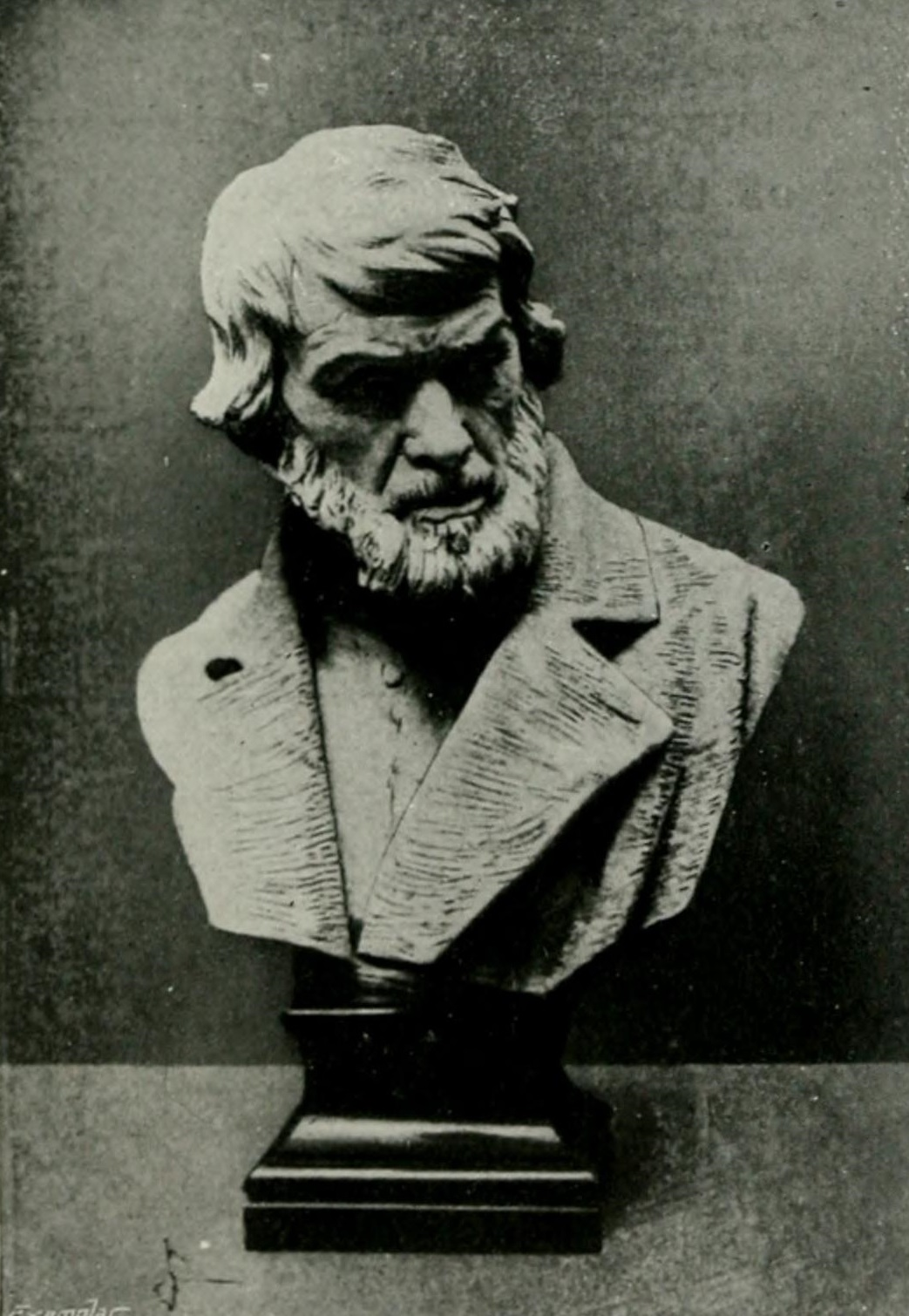
Bust

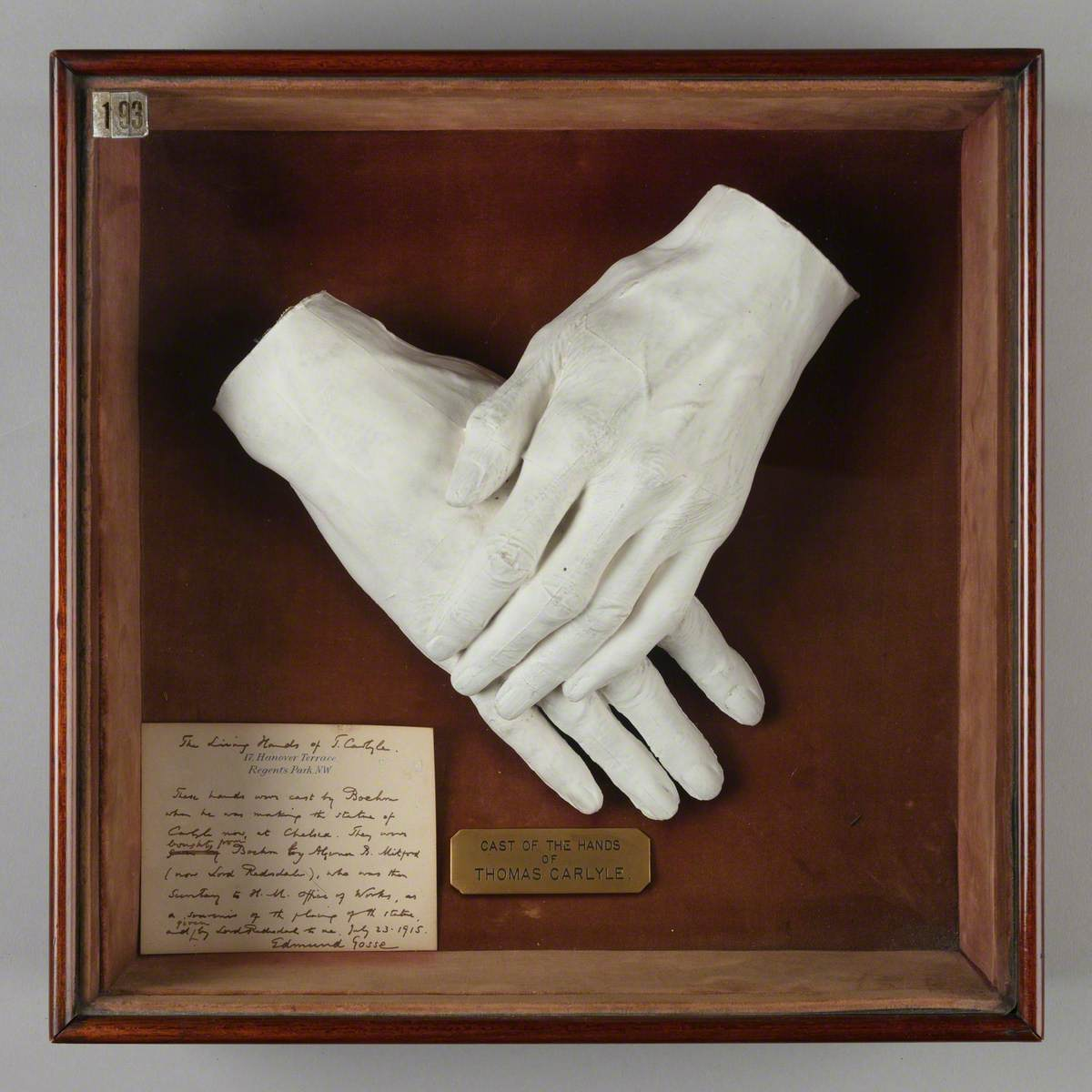
Hands

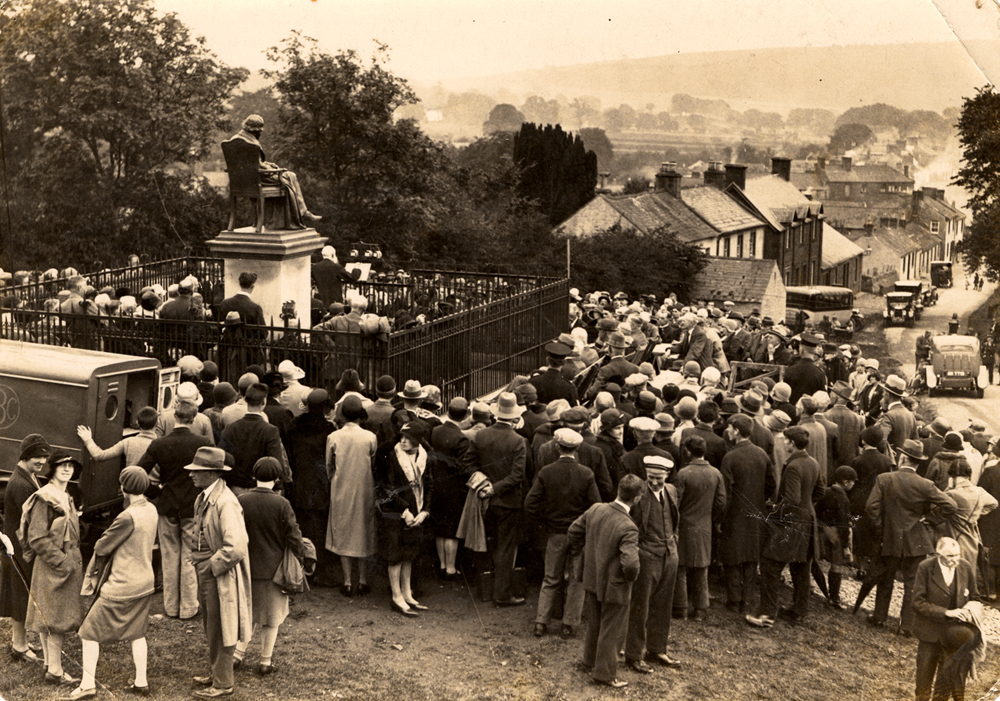
Unveiling of the statue on the Haggs
