= Peter Liddle =

British historian

Peter Liddle OBE FRHistS
- Born: 1934 (age 91–92)

Academic work
- Discipline: Historian
- Sub-discipline: Military history; First World War; Second World War; oral history
- Institutions: University of Sunderland; University of Leeds

Peter Hammond Liddle OBE FRHistS (born 1934) is a British historian and author specialising in the study of the First and Second World Wars. In the 1960s he developed the Liddle Collection, a large collection of interviews and memorabilia mainly relating to the First World War that is now held at the University of Leeds.

== Career ==
Peter Liddle was born in 1934.

In 1968 Liddle started interviewing people about their lives during and around the First World War, collecting oral history from the era. He founded the Liddle Collection and worked to expand in throughout the 1970s and 1980s, placing advertisements and recording many interviews. He also collected personal papers and memorabilia connected to the First World War and the collection grew to be the "largest archive of personal documents from the first world war". He developed a team of volunteers to handle the influx of materials. In 1974 Liddle visited New Zealand, where he interviewed 150 war veterans and took the diary of Hartley Valentine Palmer. Palmer and Liddle came into disagreement as Palmer requested the diary back, and Liddle refused, maintaining that it was his "unequivocally". He refused to return it after the New Zealand Police Association and federal government of New Zealand requested its return. In 2016 a museum in Leeds scanned images of the diary and sent them to Palmer's family. In 2017 it was reported that Liddle had taken 14 such diaries.

By 1986, Liddle was a senior lecturer of history at the University of Sunderland. That year, The Sunday Times reported that the collection was at risk of being "split up or moved to North America" because the collection had grown out of the facilities where it was being held at Sunderland. Liddle was paying £2,000 a year to house the collection and was forced to stop collecting new items. The University of Leeds had purchased the collection by 1988, where it was moved. Liddle then worked at Leeds for ten years as the "Keeper of the Collection" to develop the archive. While at Leeds, Liddle expanded the scope of the collection to include the Second World War. Many items from collected relating to that war were instead placed at Walton-on-Thames in the Second World War Experience Centre. Fred Ratcliffe, the director of Cambridge University Library, considered the collection "one of the most important private collections of 20th century papers". In 2014 the collection had over 4,300 records in 2500 boxes, and in 2011 it was written that 7,000 people had their stories documented with 4,000 interviews. After his retirement he was president of The Second World War Experience Centre, which had 6,000 accounts of the war in 2011.

Liddle's publications include Facing Armageddon: The First World War Experienced, D-Day, by Those Who Were There, and The Great War 1914–1945: Lightning Strikes Twice. In 2011 he published Captured Memories 1990-1918: Across the Threshold of War, an edited collection of twenty-nine interviews.

Liddle was appointed Officer of the Order of the British Empire (OBE) in the 2023 Birthday Honours for services to heritage and public understanding of the World Wars.
