= 1783 in art =

Events from the year 1783 in art.

== Events ==
- 28 April – The Royal Academy Exhibition of 1783 opens at Somerset House in London
- Thomas Gainsborough removes a set of 15 portraits of King George III of Great Britain and the royal family from the Royal Academy summer exhibition in London and places them at Schomberg House, his home.

== Works ==
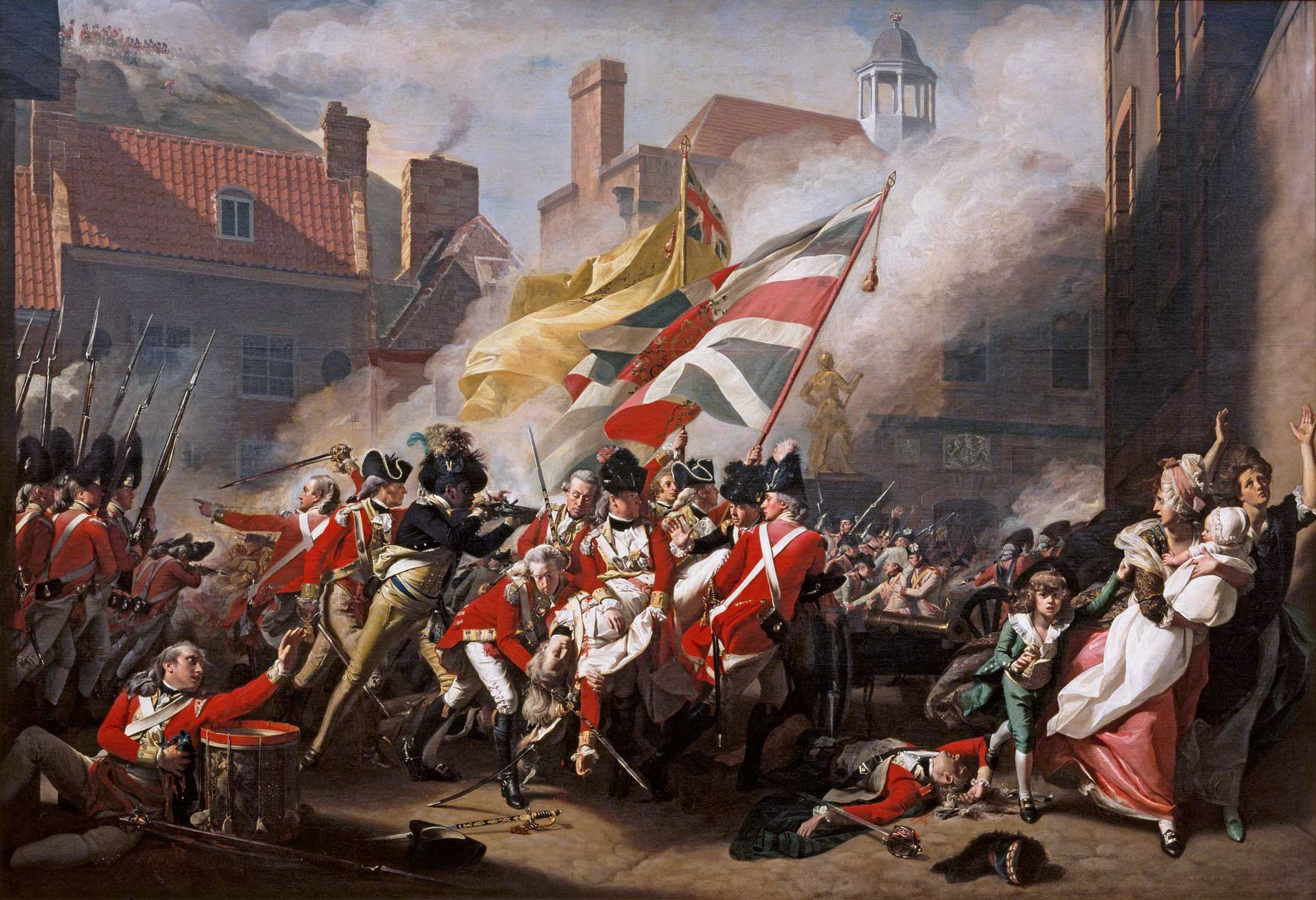
John Singleton Copley, The Death of Major Peirson.

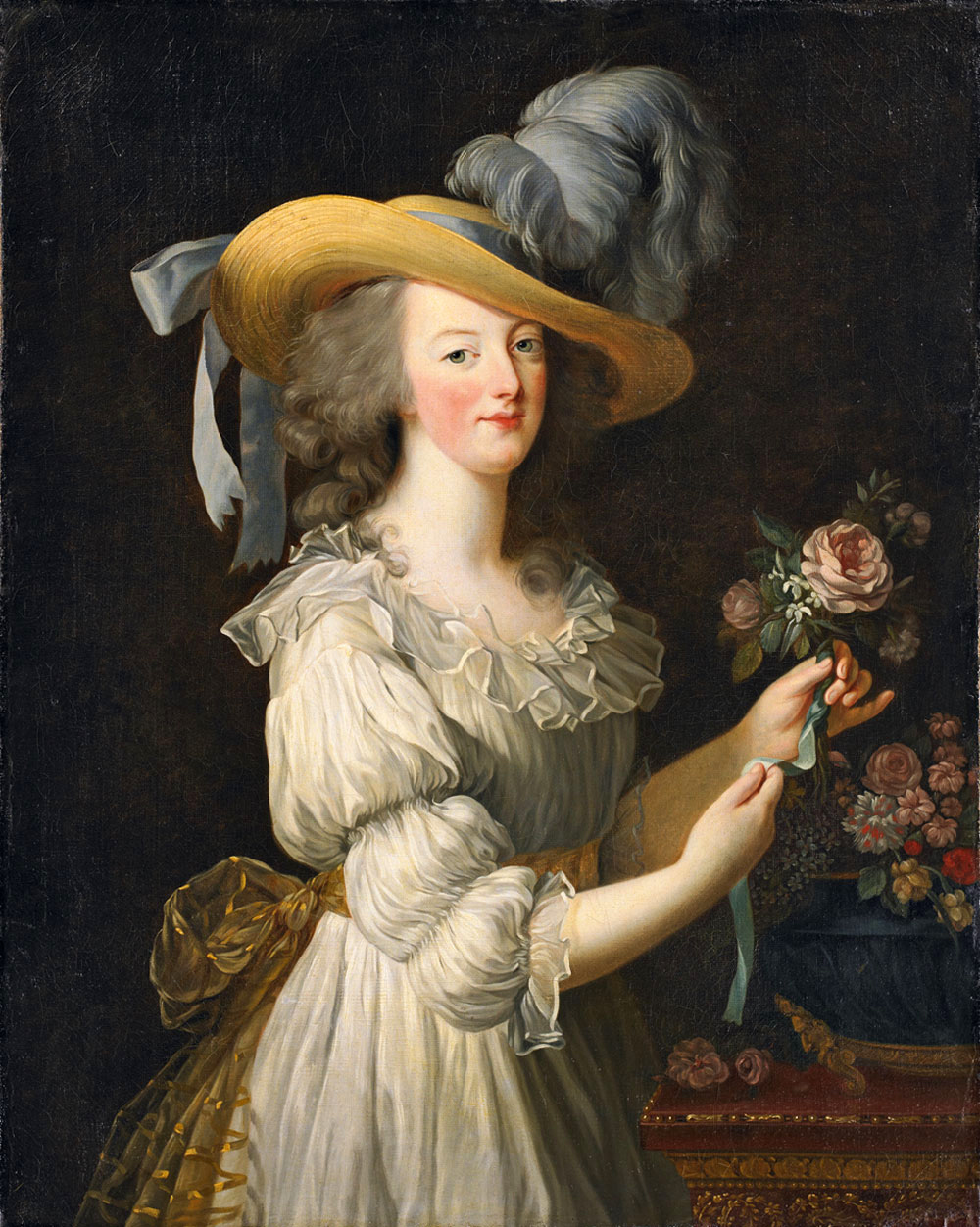
Louise Élisabeth Vigée Le Brun, Portrait of Marie Antoinette, the "muslin" portrait

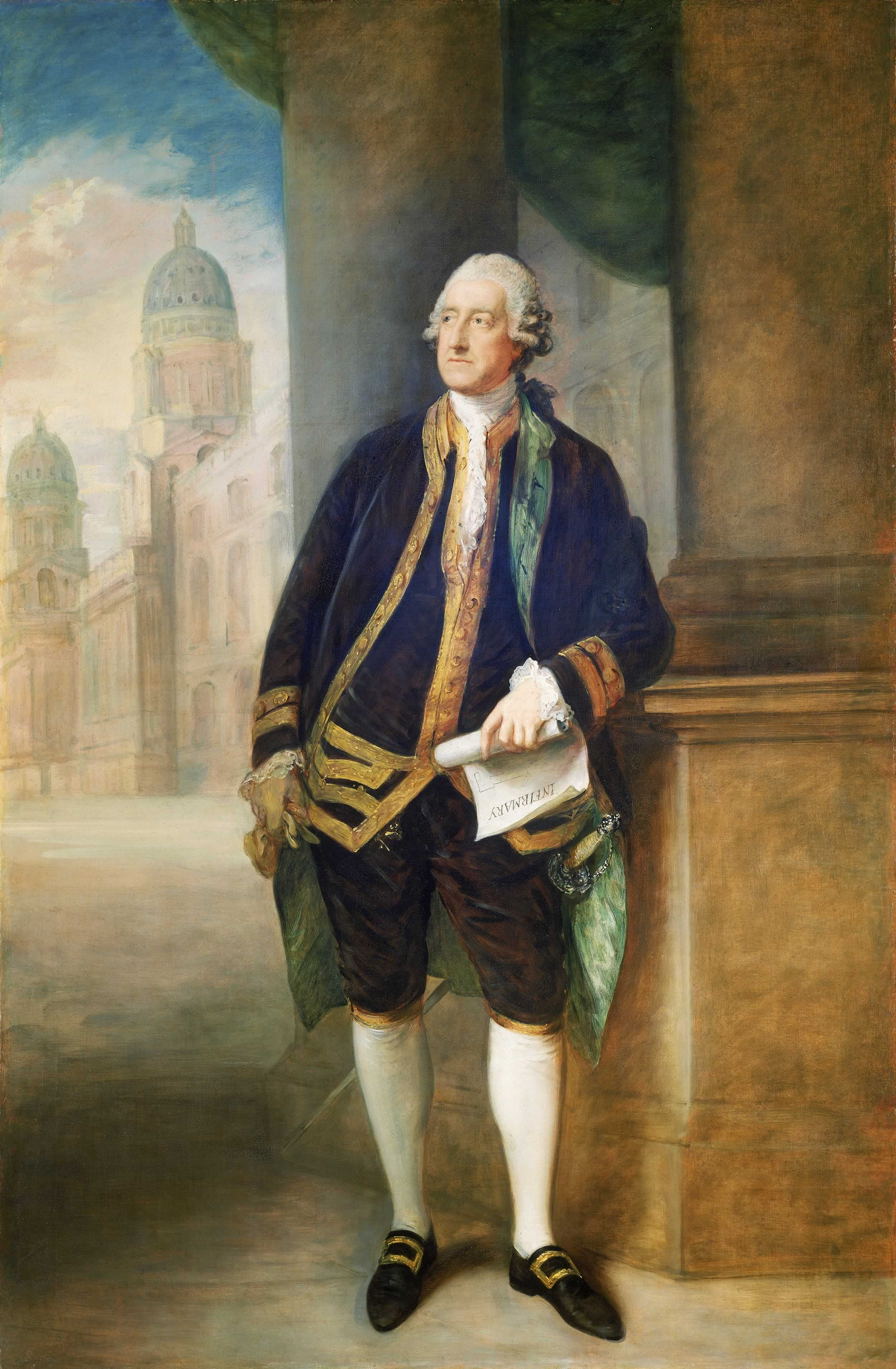
Thomas Gainsborough, Portrait of the Earl of Sandwich.

- Marie-Gabrielle Capet – Self-portrait
- John Singleton Copley
  - The Death of Major Peirson, 6 January 1781
  - The Defeat of the Floating Batteries at Gibraltar, September 1782
  - Portrait of Lord Mansfield
- Henry Fuseli – Percival Delivering Belisane from the Enchantment of Urma
- Thomas Gainsborough
  - Portrait of Admiral Rodney
  - Portrait of the Duchess of Devonshire
  - Portrait of Lord Cornwallis
  - Portrait of the Earl of Sandwich
  - The Mall in St. James's Park
  - Romantic Landscape with Sheep at a Spring
- Thomas Jones – A Storm – Prospero, Miranda and Caliban Spying the Shipwrecked Ferdinand
- Joseph Lange – Unfinished portrait of Wolfgang Amadeus Mozart, his brother-in-law
- Jean-Baptiste Le Paon - Lafayette at Yorktown
- Philip James de Loutherbourg – A Cottage in Patterdale, Westmoreland
- Joshua Reynolds
  - Admiral Hood
  - The Nativity (West window of chapel, New College, Oxford, England, design after Correggio, painted by Thomas Jervais)
- Alexander Roslin – The artist Anne Vallayer-Coster
- Gilbert Stuart – Portrait of William Woollett
- Pierre-Henri de Valenciennes – At the Villa Farnèse – Two Poplars
- Louise Élisabeth Vigée Le Brun
  - Portrait of Marie Antoinette (the "muslin" portrait)
  - Marie Antoinette with a Rose
- Francis Wheatley – The Salmon Leap, Leixlip
- Thomas Whitcombe – The Battle of the Saintes, 12th April 1782: surrender of the Ville de Paris

== Births ==
- January 2 – Christoffer Wilhelm Eckersberg, Danish painter (died 1853)
- January 4 – Aleksander Lauréus, Finnish painter (died 1823)
- February 10 – Fyodor Petrovich Tolstoy, Russian painter, engraver and silhouettist (died 1873)
- March 25 – Jean-Baptiste Paulin Guérin, French painter (died 1855)
- April 5 – Andrew Geddes, British painter (died 1844)
- April 29 – David Cox, English landscape painter (died 1859)
- May 29 – Benedetto Pistrucci, Italian-born British engraver (died 1855)
- June 19 – Thomas Sully, English-born American portrait painter (died 1872)
- September 17 – Samuel Prout, English water-colour painter (died 1852)
- October 4 – Jens Peter Møller, Danish painter (died 1854)
- December 14 – Alexandre-François Caminade, French portraitist and a religion painter (died 1862)
- December 18 – Johan Niclas Byström, Swedish sculptor (died 1844)
- date unknown
  - Maria Johanna Görtz, Swedish still life artist (died 1853)
  - Alexander Johann Dallinger von Dalling, Austrian painter (died 1844)
  - Yi Jaegwan, Korean genre works painter in the late Joseon period (died 1837)

== Deaths ==
- January 24 – George Michael Moser, Swiss-born enameller (born 1706)
- March 2 – Francisco Salzillo, Spanish sculptor (born 1707)
- March 26 – Anna Rosina de Gasc, German portrait painter (born 1713)
- April 12 – Johann Melchior Kambly, Swiss sculptor who took part in the development of the architectural style of Frederician Rococo (born 1718)
- April 14 – Jacques-Philippe Le Bas, French engraver (born 1707)
- May 26 – Anna Maria Hilfeling, Swedish portrait miniaturist artist (born 1713)
- July 8 – Johann Jakob Zeiller, Austrian fresco painter (born 1708)
- August 4 – Johannes Rach, Danish painter and draughtsman (born 1720)
- August 19 – Franz Xaver Messerschmidt, German sculptor most famous for his collection of busts of faces contorted in extreme facial expressions (born 1736)
- August 29 – William Wynne Ryland, English engraver (born 1738)
- November 19 – Jean-Baptiste Perronneau, French painter who specialized in portraits executed in pastels (born 1715)
- date unknown
  - Matthijs Accama, Dutch historical and emblematical subjects painter (born 1702)
  - Benjamin Calau, German portrait painter who used an encaustic technique (died 1724)
  - Jean-Baptiste Defernex, French sculptor especially of portrait busts (born 1729)
  - Violante Beatrice Siries, Italian painter (born 1709)
