= George Baldwin (diplomat) =

British merchant (1744-1826)

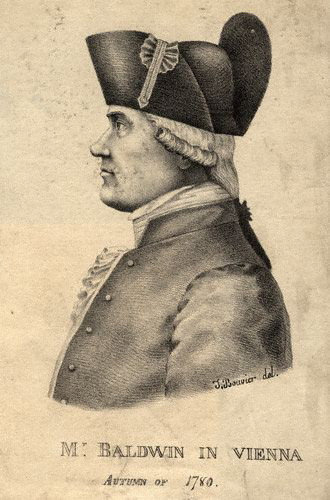
- Lithograph of George Baldwin by Joseph Bouvier (1780)

British Consul-General in Egypt
- In office 1785–1796

Personal details
- Born: May 1744 Borough, London
- Died: 19 February 1826 (aged 81) Earl's Court, London
- Spouse: Jane Maltass

George Baldwin was a British merchant, writer and diplomat of the late eighteenth and early nineteenth centuries whose career was principally based in Egypt, where he established valuable trade links for the East India Company and negotiated directly with the Ottoman governors. Despite repeated warnings of the importance of Egypt to links with British India, his advice was ignored and thus when Napoleon Bonaparte invaded Egypt in 1798 the British were ill-placed to respond directly. In 1801 he assisted the British counter-invasion of Egypt and later returned to Britain with his wife Jane Maltass, a famous society beauty. Although a highly successful merchant and diplomat, Baldwin found himself a subject of ridicule on his return to Britain for his belief in the healing power of magnets, then widely considered a pseudoscience. He retired to Earl's Court in London and died there in 1826.

== Early life ==
George Baldwin was born in May 1744 (although some sources give 1743), the son of hop merchant William Baldwin of Borough, London. Aged 16 he was sent to join his brother in Cyprus, where he was consul-general and three years later was sent to Acre.

== Career ==
During his trading operations in the Eastern Mediterranean, Baldwin became increasingly aware of the political and commercial structures of the Middle East, and in 1768, he traveled to Britain to seek permission to investigate the possibilities of trade running from British India across Egypt via the Red Sea. Although this route was nominally blocked off to non-Muslims, developing trade would be possible if it brought profit to the rulers of Egypt. On his brother's death, Baldwin returned to the Mediterranean and took up his post on Cyprus. In 1773, Mehmed Bey summoned him to Cairo and encouraged British shipping to use Suez, declaring that he would cut a canal from Suez to the Nile for ships to pass directly from the Red Sea to the Mediterranean. He was also well received in Constantinople.

=== East India Company ===
In 1774, Baldwin returned to Cairo and then back to England, where he learned that the East India Company had successfully begun a trade route between India and Suez. Offering his services to the Company, Baldwin was accepted and returned again to Egypt, where he was the only British merchant. With his knowledge of Arabic he was able to monopolise British trade caravans passing from Suez to the Nile, and ensured a fast, safe and efficient service. At some point between 1776 and 1778 he was reported to have climbed the Great Pyramid at Giza and drunk a mixture of waters from the Nile, Ganges and Thames, symbolically linking the trade routes he managed. By 1779, his trade was so successful that it began to impinge on that of the Ottoman Sultan and of the Cape of Good Hope, prompting protests and restrictions on his activities. In May, one of his caravans was attacked and looted, with some merchants taken hostage. Baldwin exchanged himself for the merchants and later escaped, reaching Smyrna.

An attempt to set up in India ended in failure when Baldwin was assaulted and robbed en route, and he and his wife returned to Britain, pausing in Vienna.

=== Return to England ===
While living in England, Baldwin wrote memoranda for the India Board of merchants, emphasising the importance of influence in Egypt to trade with India and the Middle East and the risk to British interests if France was allowed to dominate Egyptian trade. His advice was not taken up and no resources were deployed to the region until 1786, when a license was issued that allowed French merchants to make use of the Red Sea. In response, Baldwin was sent to negotiate similar licenses for British merchants and observe French activities. While there he deepened his interest in magnetic therapy, holding sessions with an Italian poet to investigate the effects of magnetism on the unconscious. When the French Revolutionary Wars broke out between Britain and France in 1793, Baldwin was able to forward the message to the British government in India, which could then take action against French territories there. In 1796, he investigated unsuccessful French efforts to persuade the Egyptian rulers to allow French armies safe passage through their territory on their way to India.

Despite his efforts, the British government terminated his post in 1793, although the message did not reach him until 1796. Frustrated, Baldwin left Cairo and thus was not present during the Mediterranean campaign of 1798, when a British force under Sir Horatio Nelson was unable to gain audience with the Egyptian government to warn of the impending attack, as they had no ambassador. When the French invaded Egypt, Baldwin left the country and traveled to Europe before taking up residence in Florence. After the Battle of Marengo, he moved to Naples and from there assisted with the planning of the British counter-invasion of Egypt and travelled with the army as a logistical officer, witnessing the successful campaign and securing local sources of supplies from his contacts in the country.

In May 1801, Baldwin returned to London and settled there, continuing his studies in magnetic theory, which by this time had been dismissed as pseudoscience. As a result, Baldwin was ridiculed and although he published a number of works on the subject in 1801 and 1802, he did not write again until 1811, when his research was privately printed.

== Personal life ==
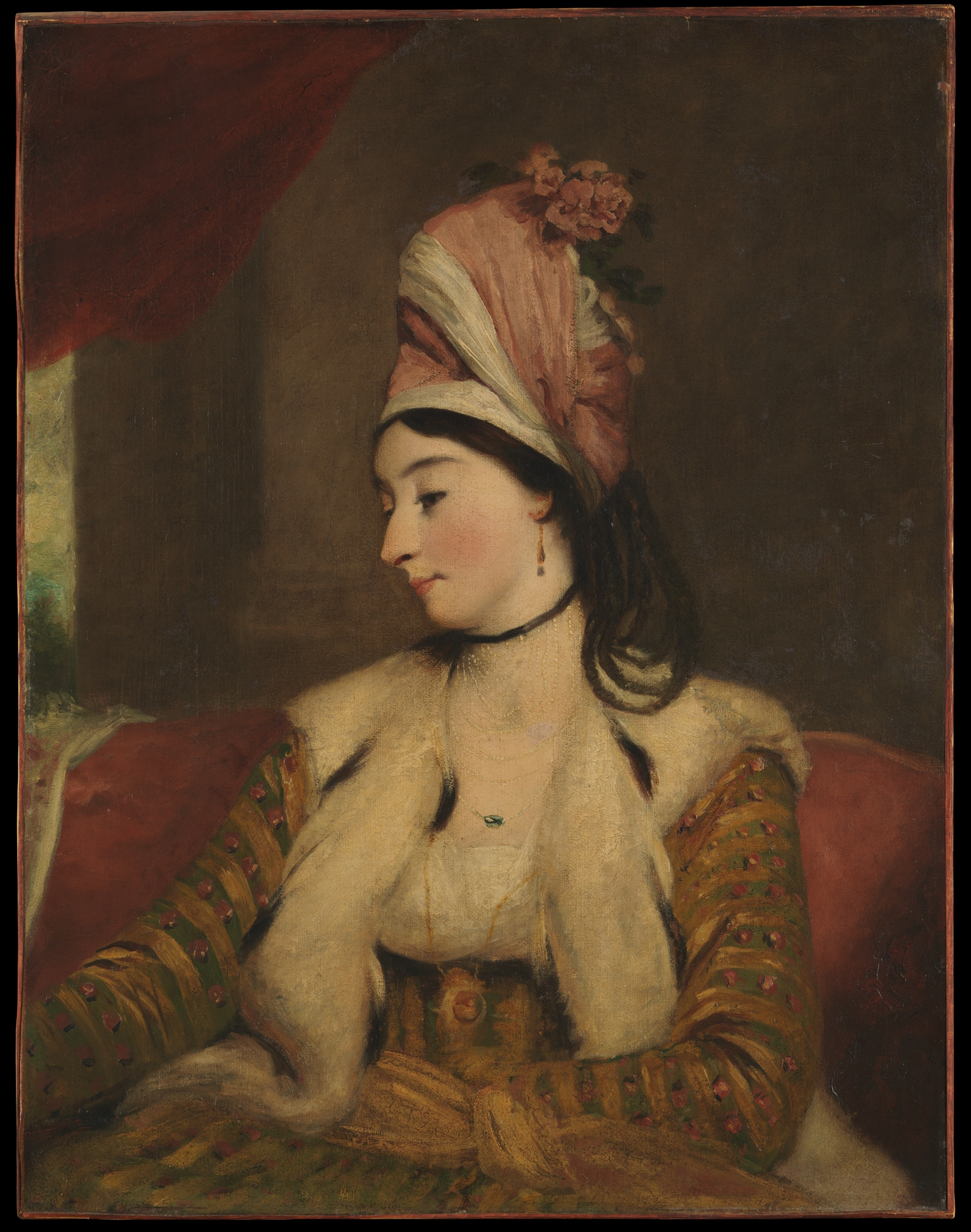
Portrait of his wife, Jane Maltass Baldwin by the workshop of Sir Joshua Reynolds, ca. 1782, at the Metropolitan Museum of Art

Shortly after one of his caravans in the Ottoman was attached in 1779 and he escaped to Smyrna, he married Jane Maltass (1763–1839), the daughter of his agent and a famous society beauty. Although they had a daughter, the marriage was an unhappy one, punctuated by frequent arguments.

While pausing in Vienna on their way to Britain, Jane was celebrated in society: a bust of her was made for Joseph II, Holy Roman Emperor by the Italian sculptor Giuseppe Ceracchi and Count Wenzel Anton Kaunitz-Rietberg commissioned a full-length portrait. In London, she was painted by Joshua Reynolds, William Pyne and Richard Cosway. Baldwin became popular in society and became an acquaintance of William Blake, who mentions him and Cosway in one of his poems. It was his friendship with Cosway that led to his introduction into the field of magnetic therapy, the theory that magnetic force had healing powers.

He died in 1826 in Earl's Court and his art collection was sold at Christie's in May 1828 over two days.
