= Oliver Cromwell Dissolving the Long Parliament =

Painting by Benjamin West

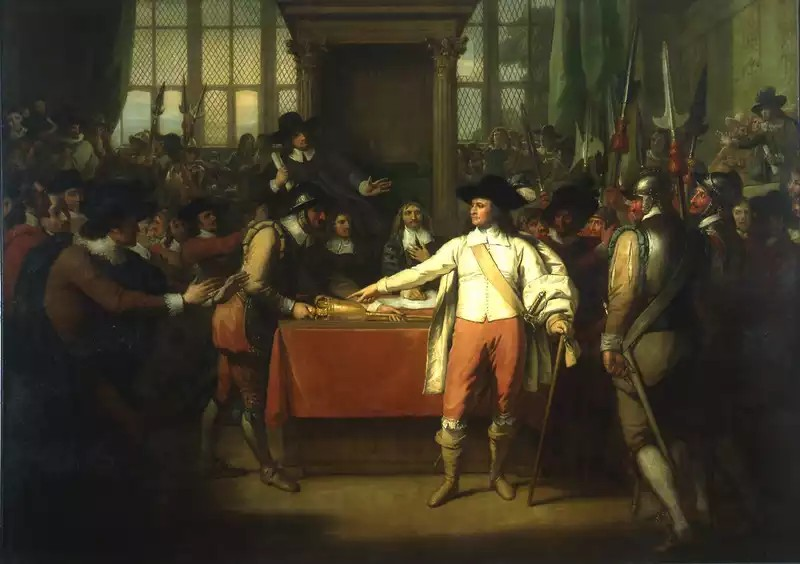
- Artist: Benjamin West
- Year: 1782
- Type: Oil on canvas, history painting
- Dimensions: 153 cm × 214.6 cm (60 in × 84.5 in)
- Location: Montclair Art Museum, New Jersey

Oliver Cromwell Dissolving the Long Parliament is a 1782 history painting by the American-born British artist Benjamin West. It depicts the Long Parliament being forcibly dissolved by Oliver Cromwell his soldiers on 20 April 1653 during the Commonwealth of England. Cromwell then assumed the role of Lord Protector until his death in 1658.

It was one of four paintings of British history commissioned from West by Earl Grosvenor to hang in his London residence alongside the artist's celebrated The Death of General Wolfe. The others were The Battle of the Boyne, The Battle of La Hogue and King Charles II Landing on the Beach at Dover.

The Pennsylvania-born West settled in London in the 1760s and became the country's leading history painter, working frequently for George III. A decade after the Grosvenor commission, West was elected as the second president of the Royal Academy in succession to Joshua Reynolds. The work was exhibited at the academy's Summer Exhibition of 1783 at Somerset House. Today the painting is in the collection of the Montclair Art Museum in New Jersey. An engraving based on the painting was produced by John Hall in 1789.

== Bibliography ==
- Grossman, Lloyd. Benjamin West and the Struggle to be Modern. Merrell Publishers, 2015.
- Hoock, Holger. Empires of the Imagination: Politics, War, and the Arts in the British World, 1750–1850. Profile Books, 2010.
- Prieto, Moisés. Dictatorship in the Nineteenth Century: Conceptualisations, Experiences, Transfers. Routledge, 2021.
