= Royal Academy Exhibition of 1783 =

1783 art exhibition in London

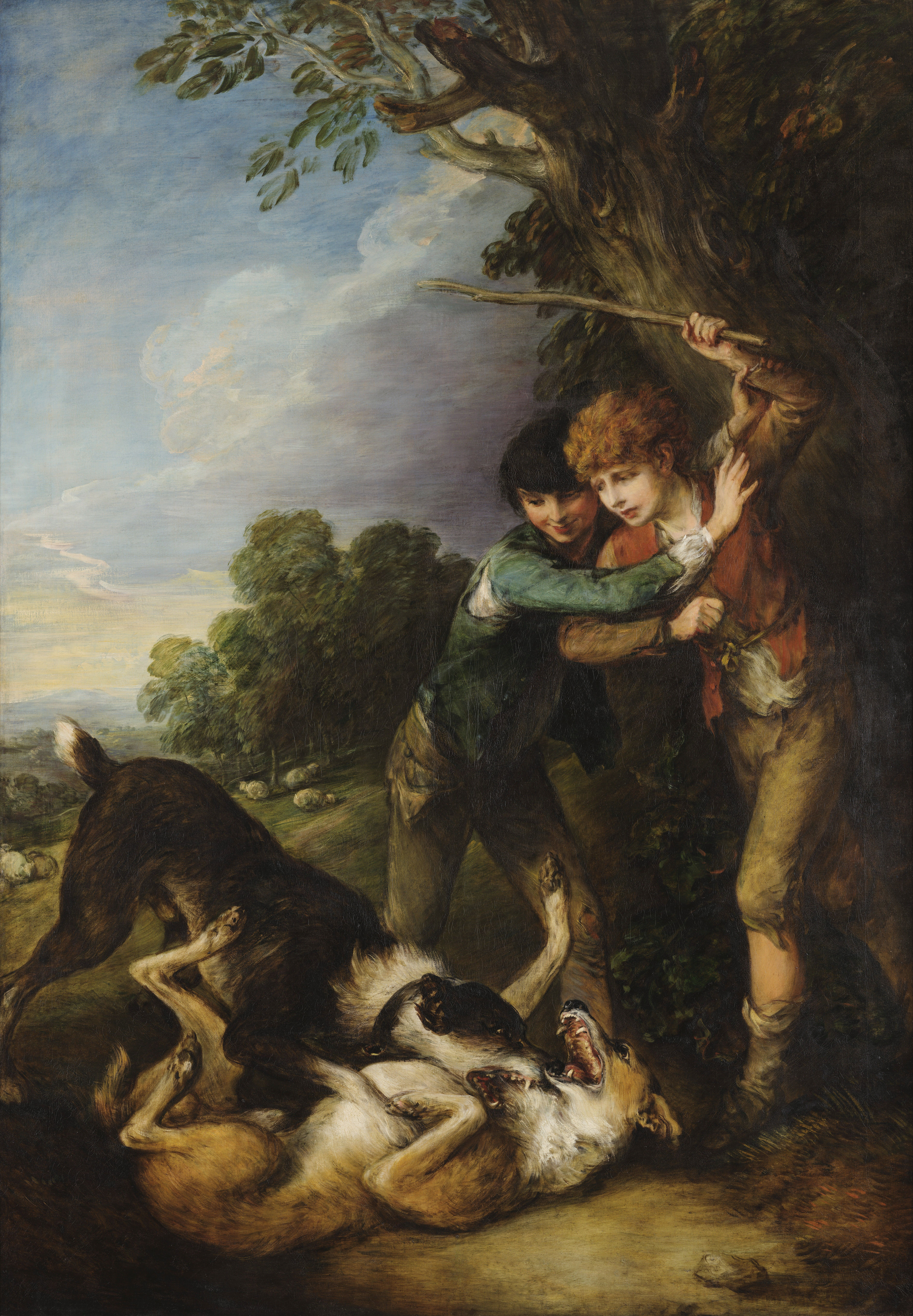
Two Shepherd Boys with Dogs Fighting by Thomas Gainsborough

The Royal Academy Exhibition of 1783 was the annual Summer Exhibition of the British Royal Academy of Arts. It was held at Somerset House in London from 28 April to 3 June 1783.

The President of the Royal Academy Sir Joshua Reynolds hosted the annual Academy dinner at the opening of the exhibition, which was attended by Samuel Johnson, James Boswell and Pasquale Paoli as well as "half the cabinet". Although the show drew in large audiences, Horace Walpole criticised it as "an indifferent exhibition" and felt that "Sir Joshua seems to decline since his illness".

His rival Thomas Gainsborough submitted one of the most acclaimed works of the exhibition Two Shepherd Boys with Dogs Fighting. His other works also received widespread attention. These included landscapes featuring mountainous scenes. He also displayed a series of portrait paintings featuring George III and the Royal Family.

The Swiss-born founding member of the Royal Academy Angelica Kauffman displayed several neoclassical history paintings. The American Benjamin West exhibited scenes from British history such as Oliver Cromwell Dissolving the Long Parliament as well as portrait of the king. Henry Fuseli's submissions included The Weird Sisters based on a scene from William Shakespeare's Macbeth. Maria Cosway who had enjoyed great success with her Duchess of Devonshire as Cynthia the year before, exhibited the now lost painting The Hours.

Several references to the recently ended American War of Independence featured in the submissions including Thomas Whitcombe's The Destruction of the Floating Batteries at the Great Siege of Gibraltar and The Close of the Battle of the Saintes by Nicholas Pocock depicted a decisive victory over the French navy in the Caribbean. Critics noted with disappointment the absence of George Romney and Joseph Wright of Derby who were in dispute with the Academy.

== Gallery ==
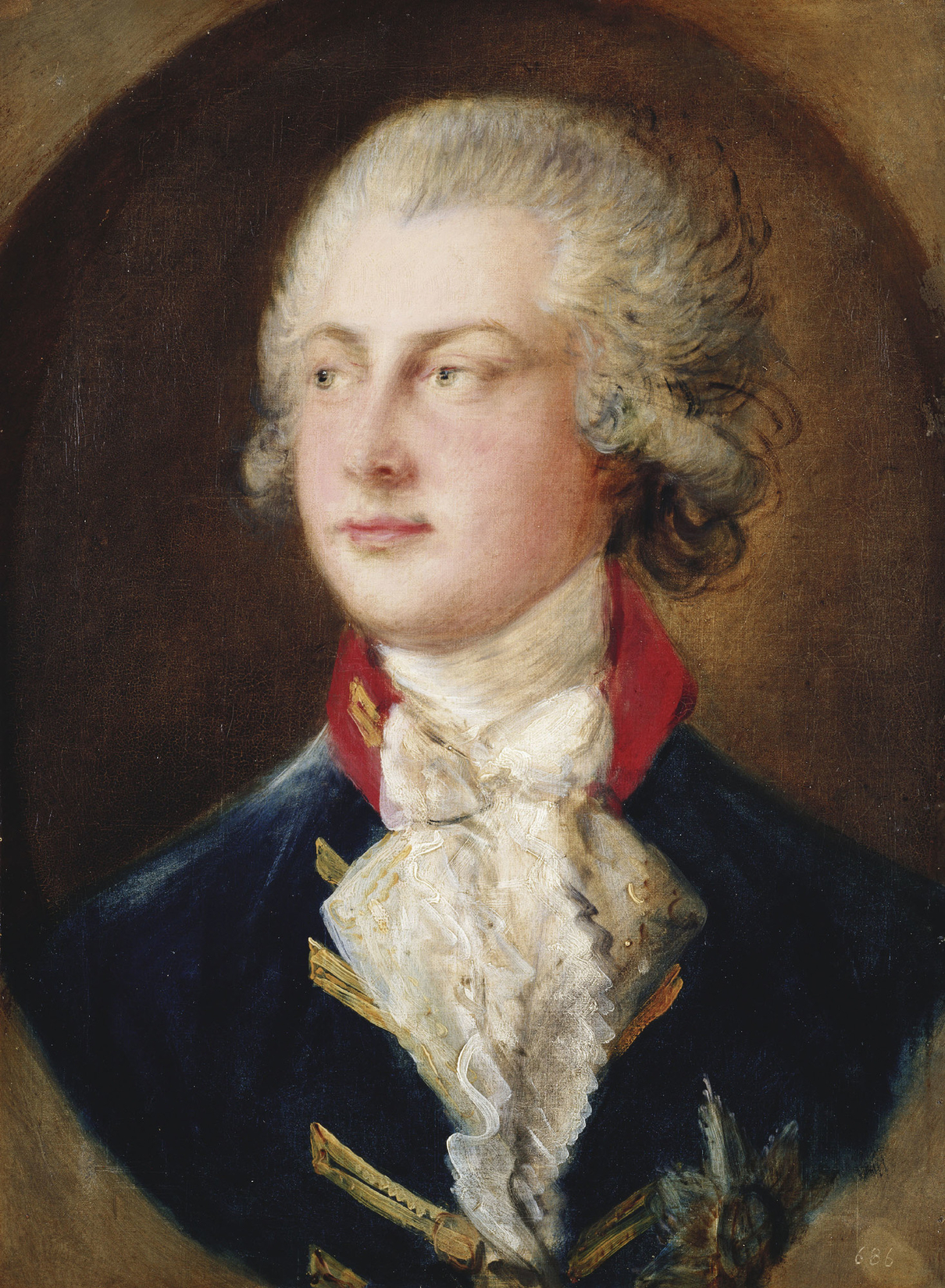
Portrait of George, Prince of Wales by Thomas Gainsborough

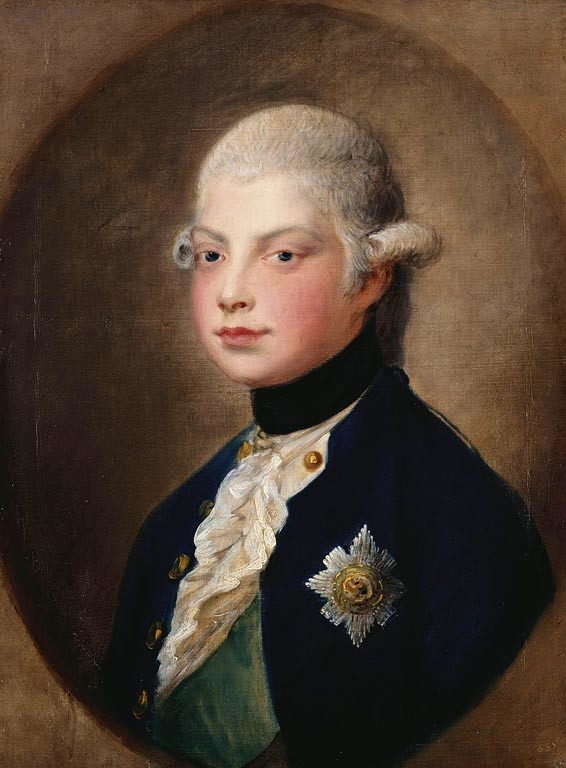
Portrait of the Duke of Clarence by Thomas Gainsborough

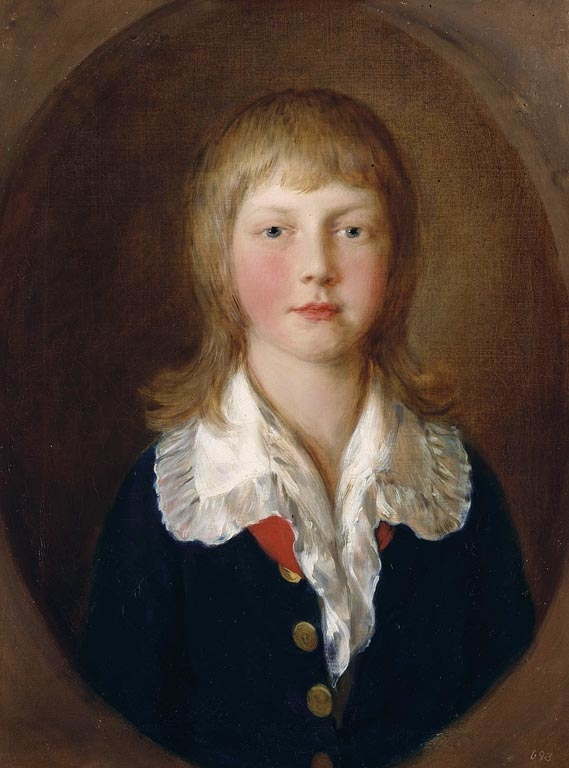
Portrait of the Duke of Cumberland by Thomas Gainsborough

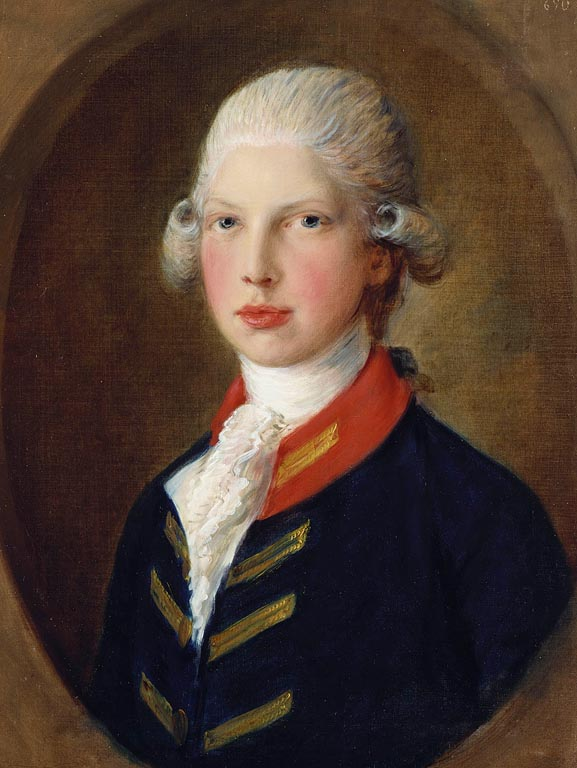
Portrait of the Duke of Kent by Thomas Gainsborough

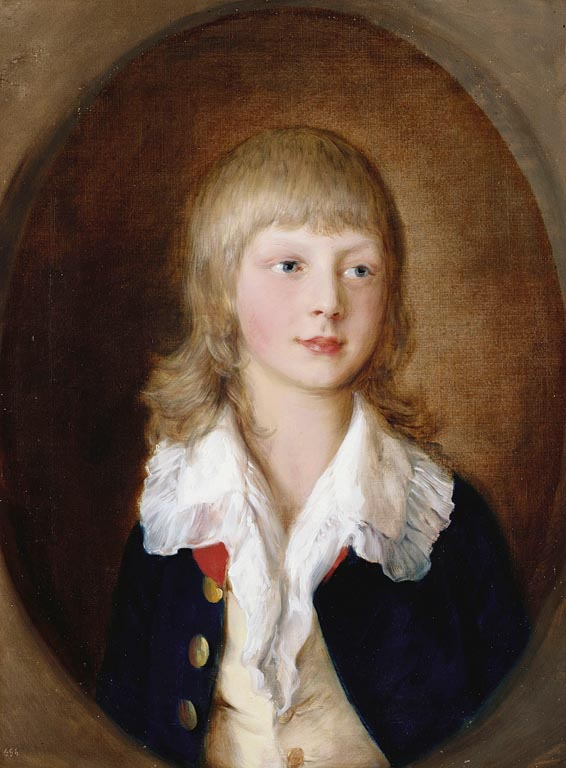
Portrait of Prince Adolphus by Thomas Gainsborough

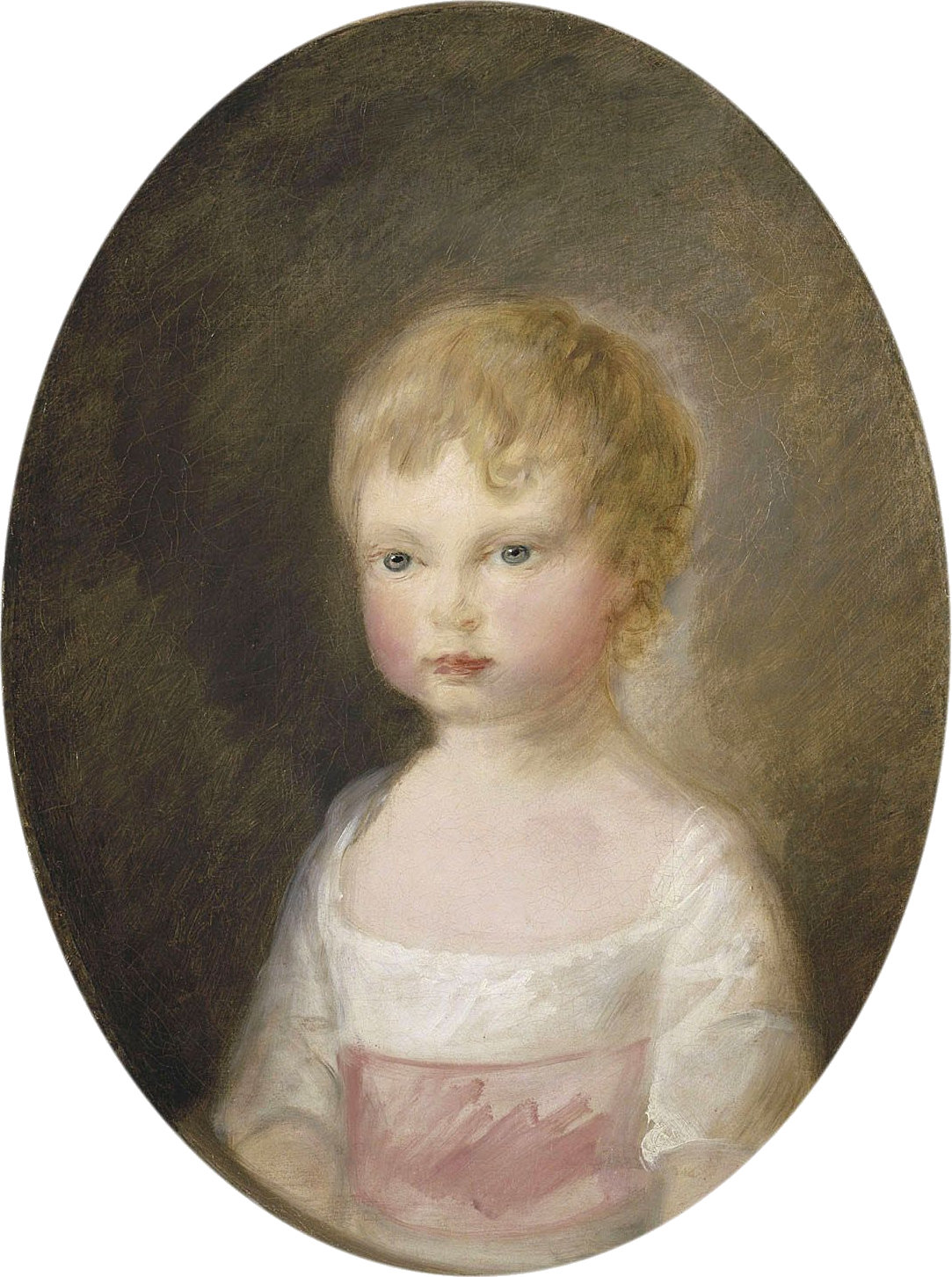
Portrait of Prince Alfred by Thomas Gainsborough

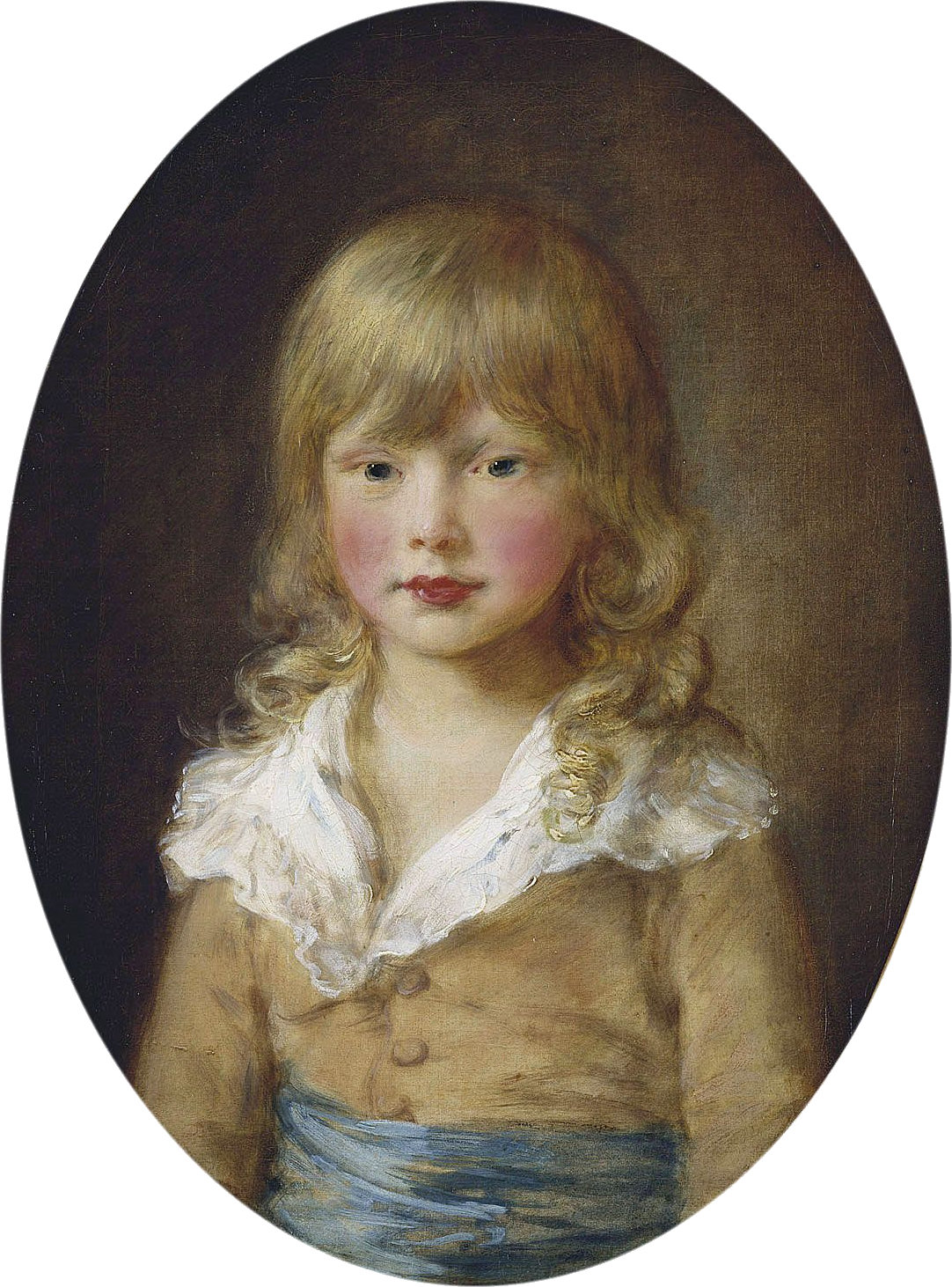
Portrait of Prince Octavius by Thomas Gainsborough

Portrait of the Duchess of Devonshire by Thomas Gainsborough

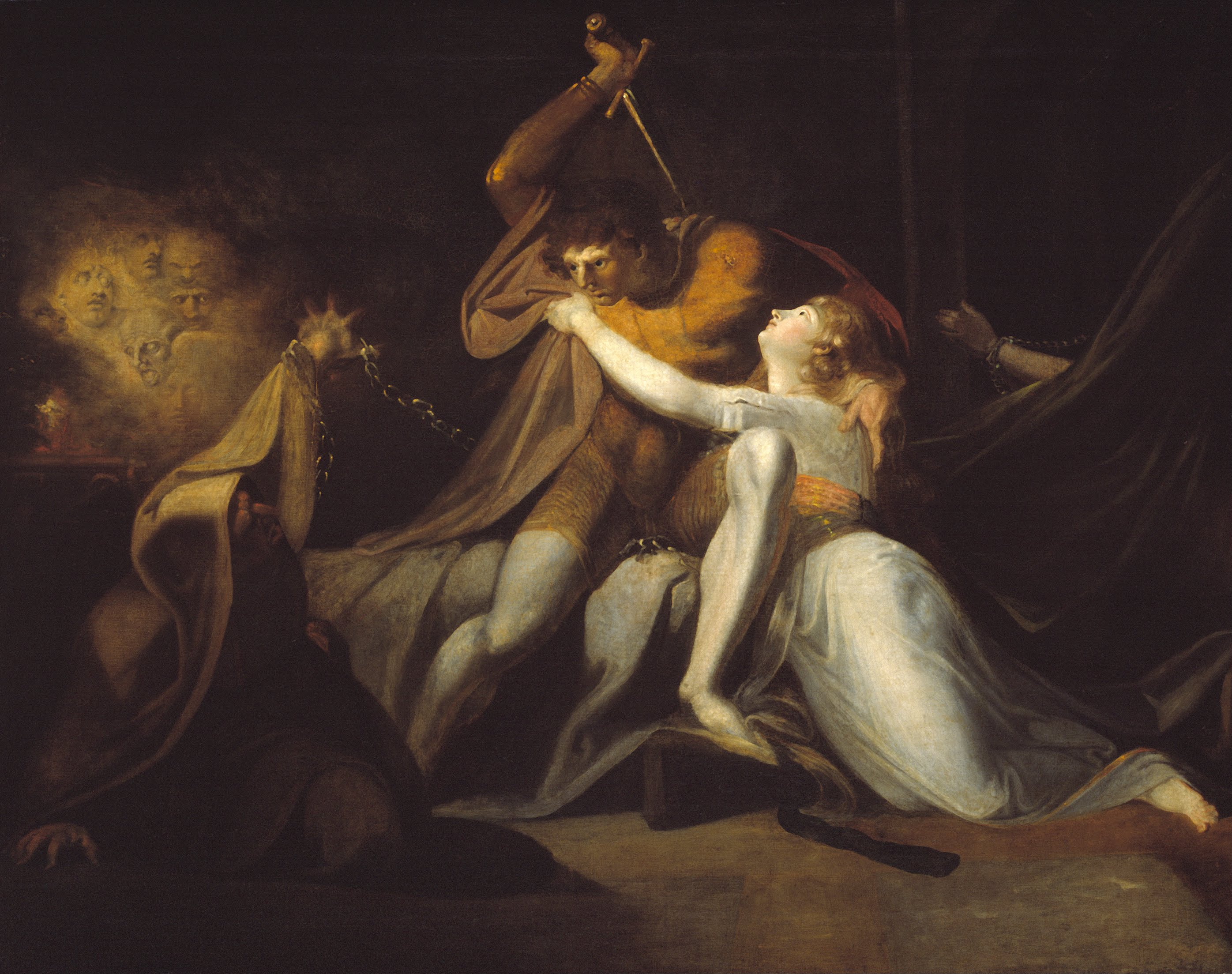
Percival Delivering Belisane from the Enchantment of Urma by Henry Fuseli

The Weird Sisters by Henry Fuseli

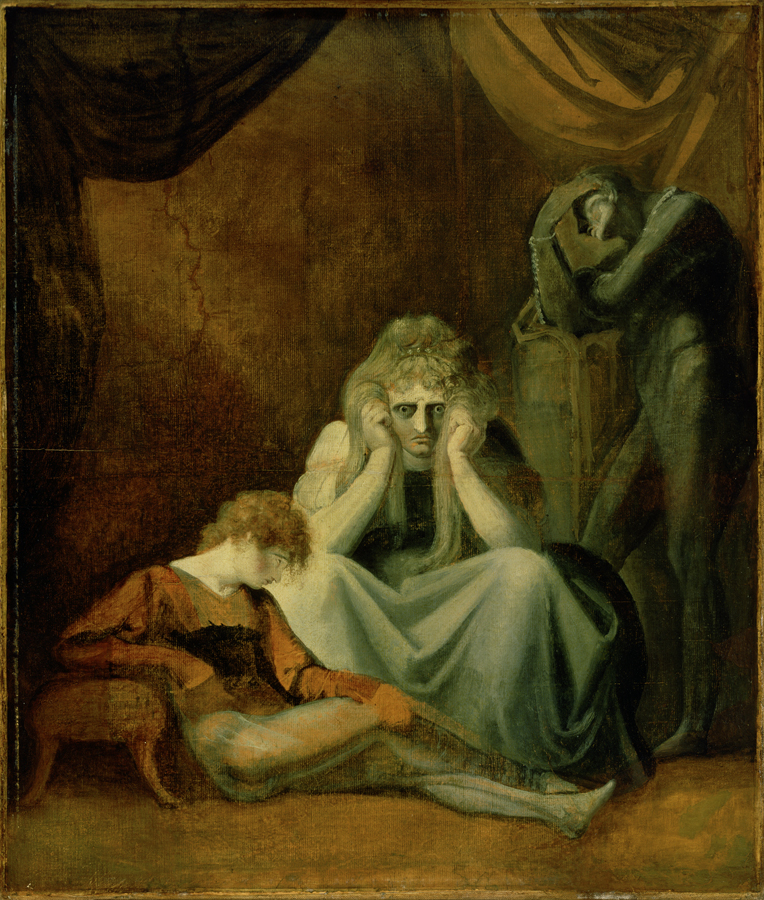
Lady Constance, Arthur and Salisbury by Henry Fuseli

General Monck Receiving Charles II on the Beaches of Dover by Benjamin West

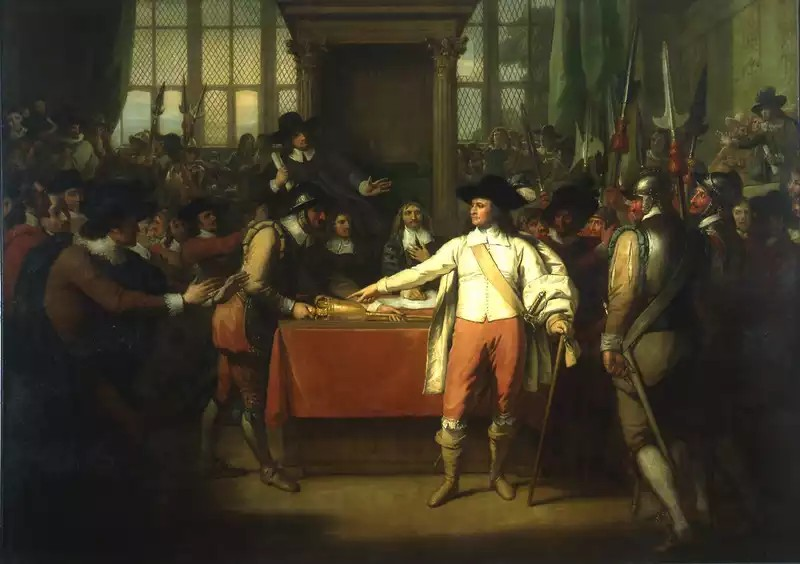
Oliver Cromwell Dissolving the Long Parliament by Benjamin West

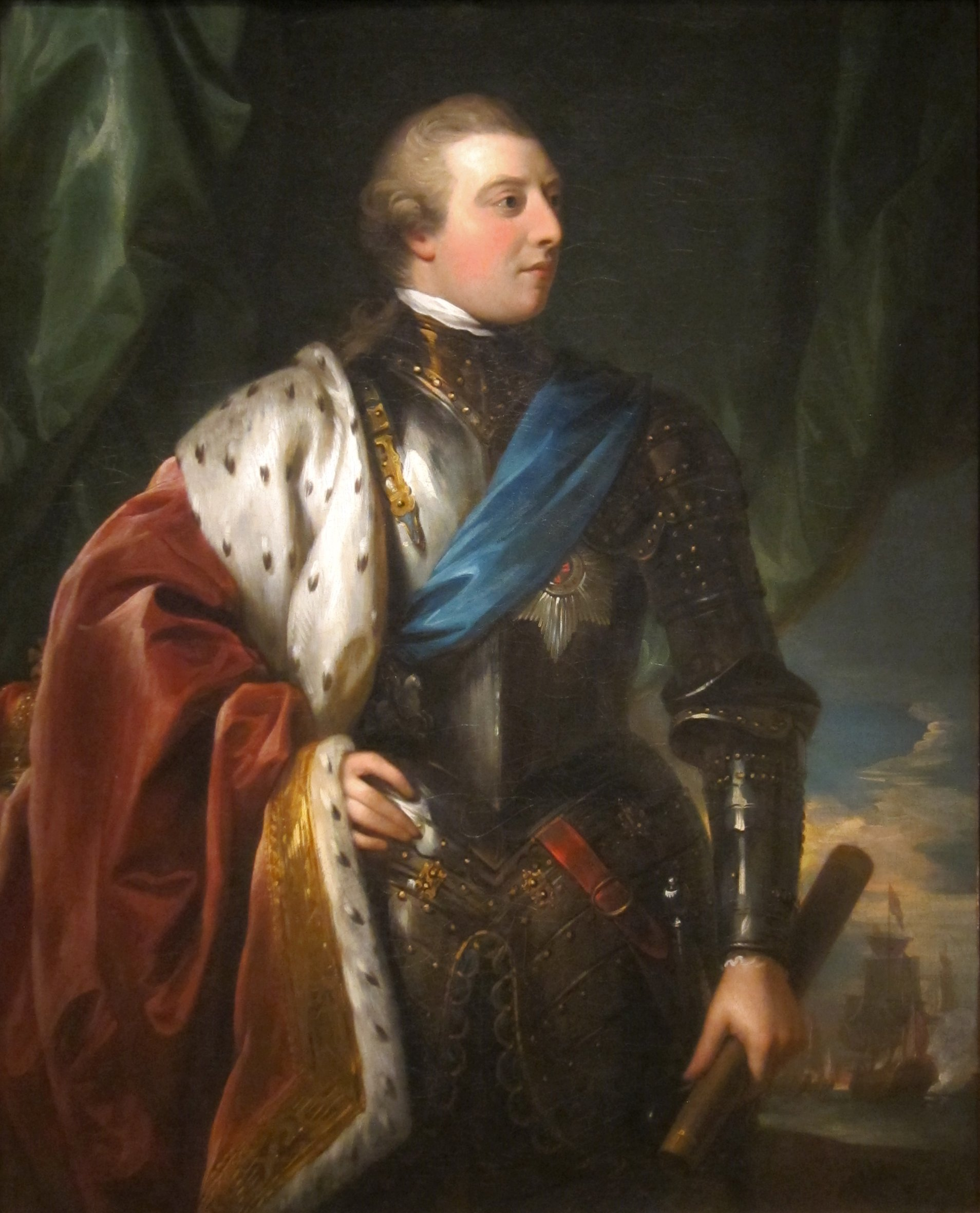
Portrait of George III by Benjamin West

The Evening of a Summer's Day in the South of France by Philip James de Loutherbourg

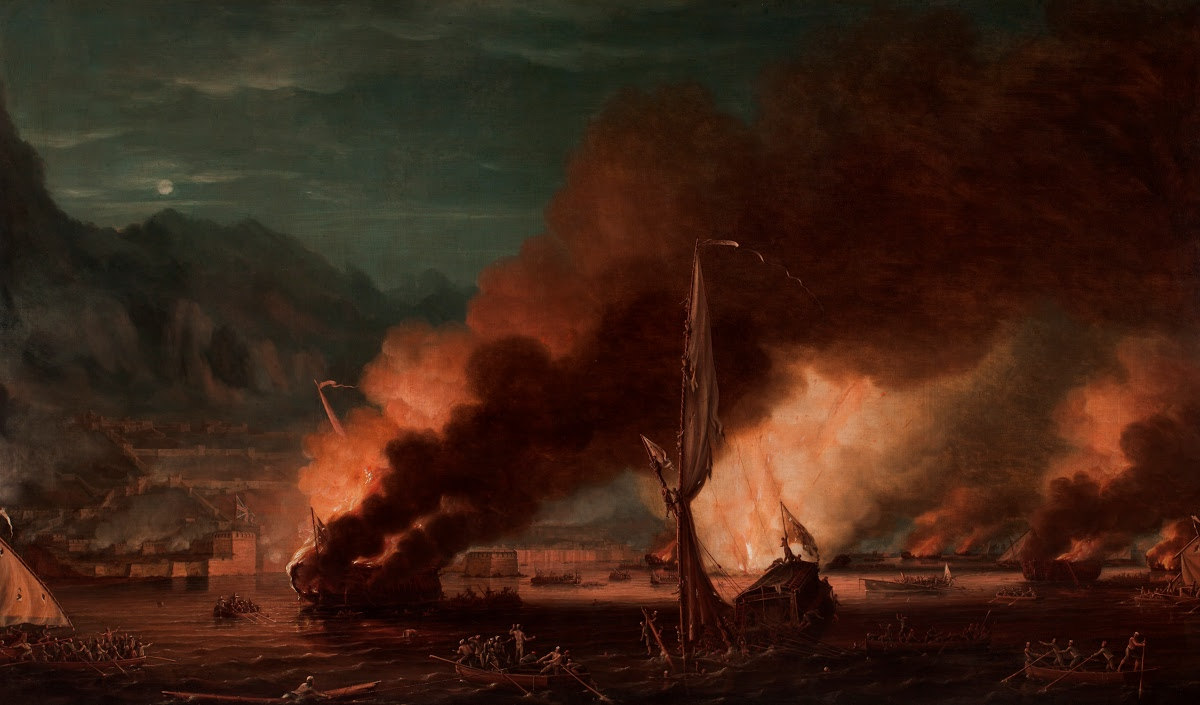
The Destruction of the Floating Batteries at Gibraltar by Thomas Whitcombe

The Close of the Battle of the Saintes by Nicholas Pocock

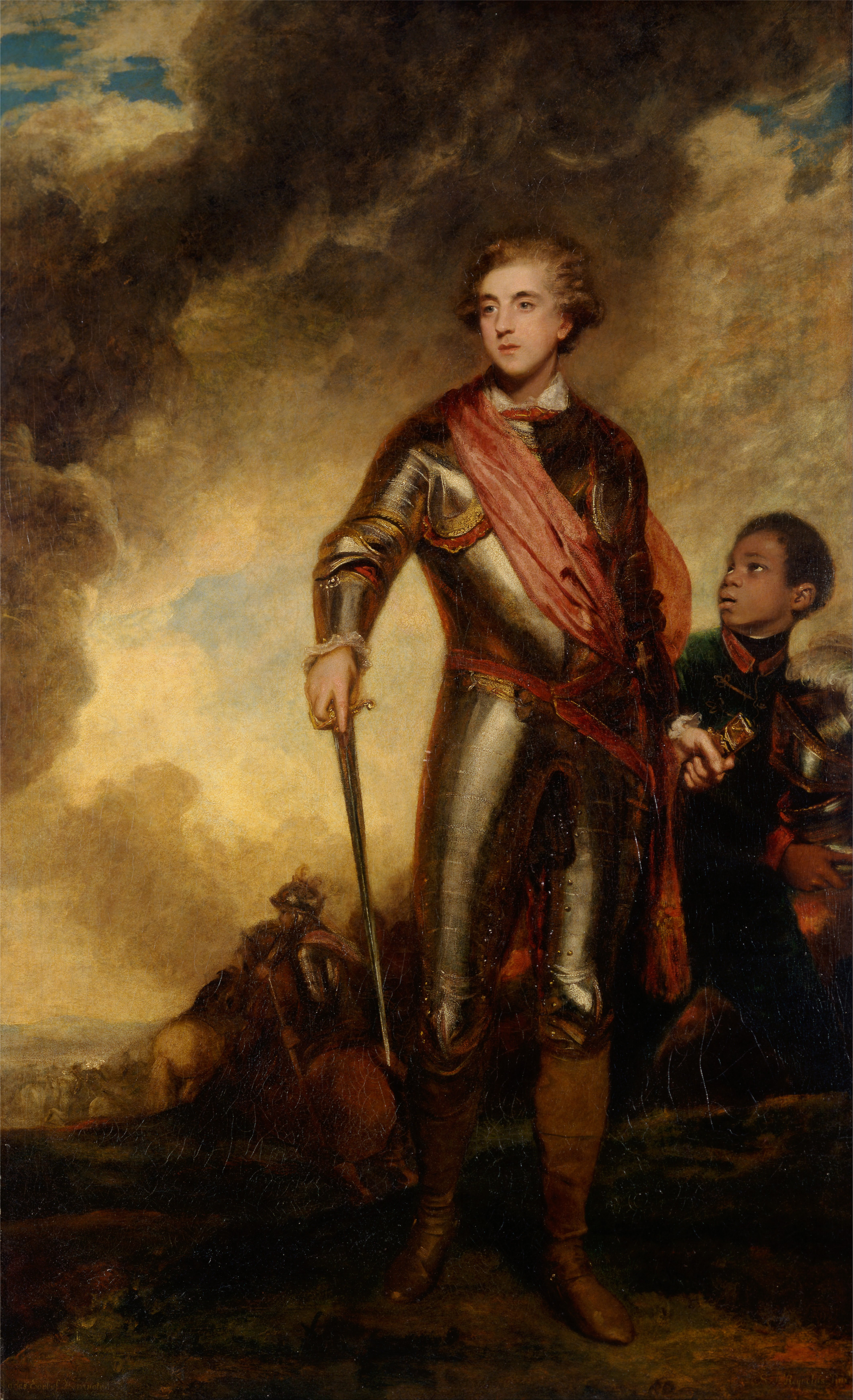
Portrait of the Earl of Harrington by Joshua Reynolds

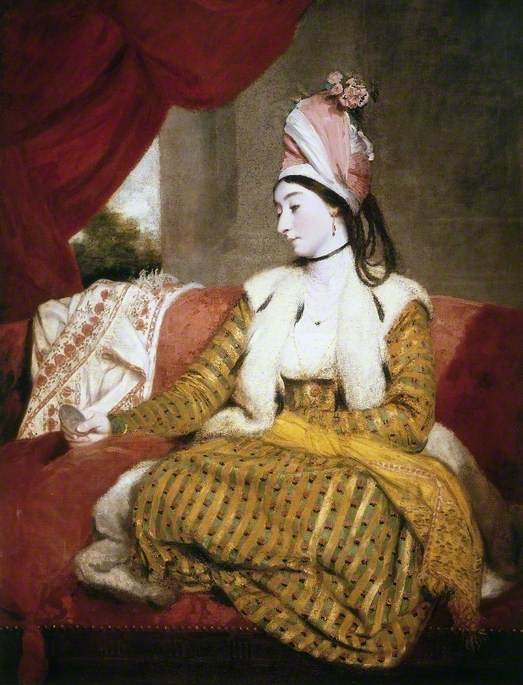
Portrait of Jane Baldwin by Joshua Reynolds

== Bibliography ==
- Eger, Elizabeth (ed.) Bluestockings Displayed. Cambridge University Press, 2013.
- Hamilton, James. Gainsborough: A Portrait. Hachette UK, 2017.
- Haywood, Ian, Matthews, Susan & Shannon, Mary L. (ed) Romanticism and Illustration. Cambridge University Press, 2019.
- Hoock, Holger. Empires of the Imagination: Politics, War, and the Arts in the British World, 1750–1850. Profile Books, 2010.
- Kamensky, Jane. A Revolution in Color: The World of John Singleton Copley. W. W. Norton & Company, 2016.
- McIntyre, Ian. Joshua Reynolds: The Life and Times of the First President of the Royal Academy. Allen Lane, 2003.
