= Jane Baldwin =

Artist's model (1763-1839)

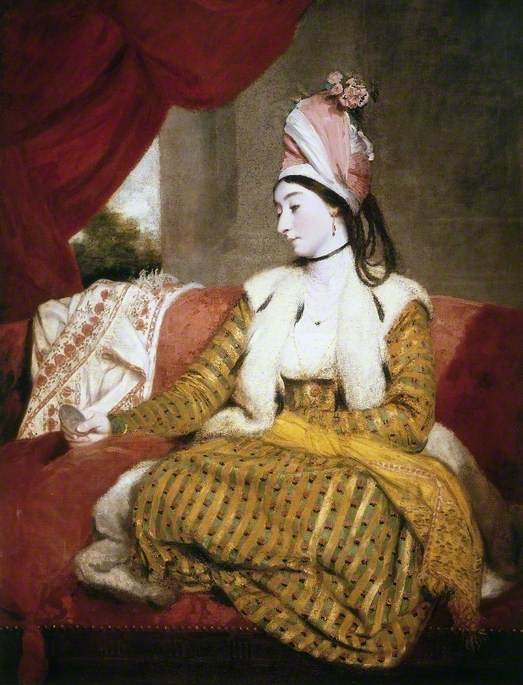
- by Joshua Reynolds
- Born: Jane Maltass; 26 June 1763; İzmir
- Died: 7 July 1839 (aged 76); Clapham
- Known for: artist's model
- Spouse: George Baldwin
- Children: a daughter

Jane Baldwin born Jane Maltass (26 June 1763 – 7 July 1839) was an Ottoman Empire-born beauty who moved to England. She was an exotic "pretty Greek" model for leading artists in Vienna and England. She joined London society and assisted her husband in obtaining his position in Egypt.

== Life ==
Baldwin was born in İzmir in 1763, her mother was Marguerite Icard and her father, William Maltass, was a merchant from Yorkshire.

She married a British diplomat and merchant George Baldwin who was her father's agent. He was employed by the East India Company and spoke fluent Arabic. He became a prisoner after one of his caravans was attacked in 1779, but he escaped and went to Izmir. Their unhappy marriage created a daughter.

While pausing in Vienna on their way to Britain, Jane became a celebrity. Joseph II, Holy Roman Emperor commissioned a bust of her by the Italian sculptor Giuseppe Ceracchi and the ambassador Count Wenzel Anton Kaunitz-Rietberg commissioned a full-length portrait.

When Jane Baldwin arrived in London, her husband was considered intriguing and she attended a ball given by George III wearing exotic style clothing. She was painted by Joshua Reynolds. It was Reynolds who volunteered to make the painting of her, which remained in his own collection. She sat for the painting and passed the time by reading a book of poetry. In the final painting Reynolds replaces the book with a coin. She is dressed in an Eastern style that was fashionable and known as Turquerie. The painting was exhibited at the Royal Academy in 1782 with the title Portrait of a Grecian Lady.

Jane Baldwin was known as the "pretty Greek" even though her parents were from Britain. This was because she had been brought up in a part of Turkey known for its Greek population. She was admired by the writer Frances Burney, Hester Lynch Piozzi and Dr. Samuel Johnson for her uncontrived beauty. Johnson asked her about the appearance of Abbysinians who had previously appeared in his book The History of Rasselas, Prince of Abissinia and he also asked her husband's permission before he kissed her.

Her husband said that William Henry Pyne's painting of her was "too voluptuous". Richard Cosway also painted her, and it was Cosway who told her husband about the claimed healing power of magnetic therapy. Jane is credited with furthering her husband's career. George Baldwin was appointed to be the British consul-general in Egypt by the Prince of Wales at Jane's suggestion. They set out together in 1786 but at Naples she went on to Smyrna to see her family while her husband continued. They were reunited in Alexandria and were together until 1791 when she returned to Britain due to her ill-health. In England she rejoined society and attended a masquerade as a Grecian slave. Her husband returned to Britain in 1801.

In 1821, engravings of her portrait by Reynolds were published.

Her husband died in 1826 in Earl's Court, and his art collection of lithographs, cameos and busts was sold at Christie's in May 1828.

Jane Baldwin died in 1839 and was buried in Clapham.
