= The Mall, London =

Road in London, England

Coordinates: 51°30′15″N 0°8′7″W

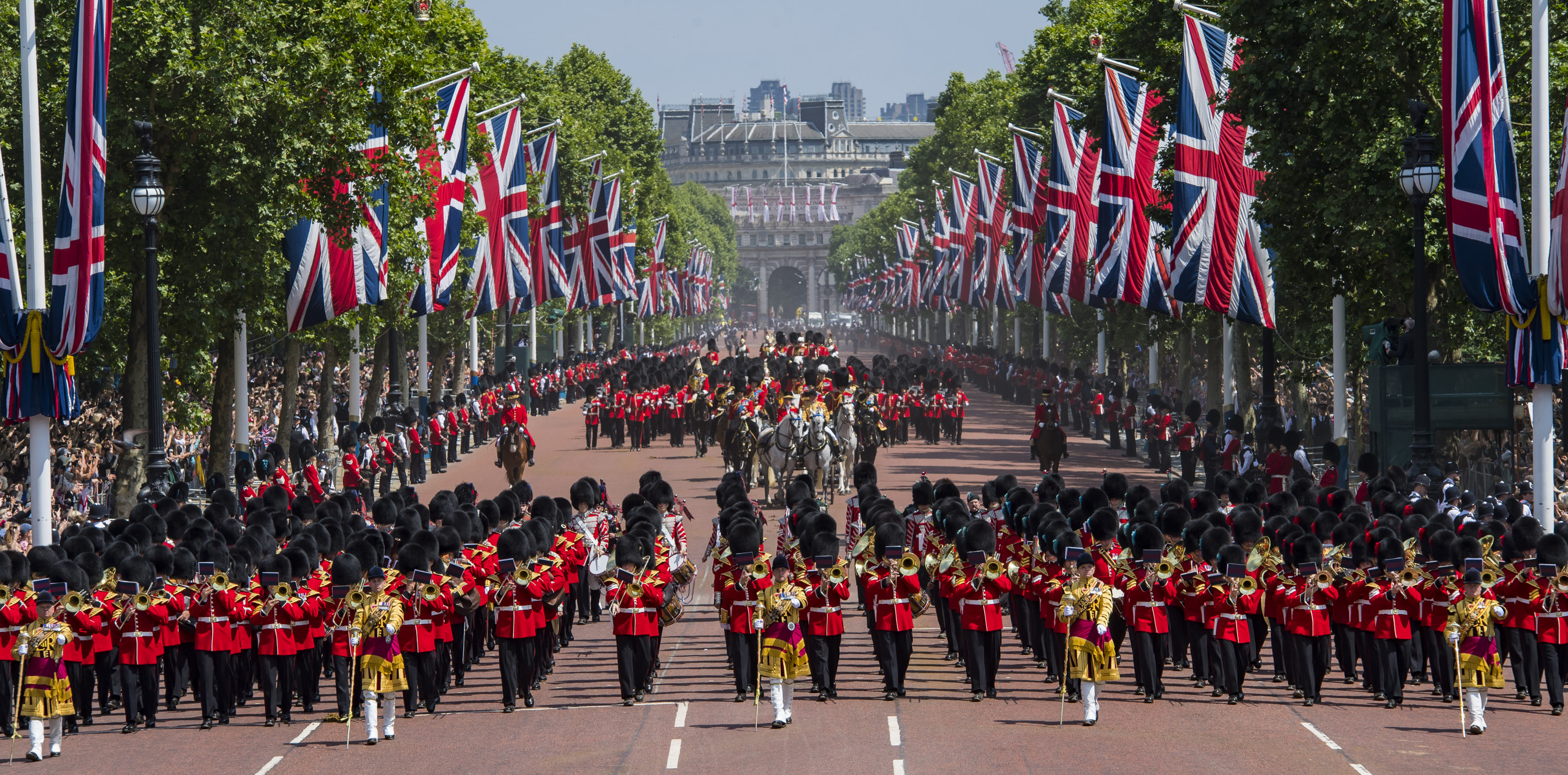
Queen Elizabeth II and royal family return from Trooping the Colour in 2018 with Admiralty Arch in the background.

The Mall (/ˈmæl/) is a ceremonial route and roadway in the City of Westminster, central London, that runs 1 kilometre (0.62 mi) between Buckingham Palace at its western end and Trafalgar Square via Admiralty Arch to the east. Along the north side of The Mall is green space and St James's Palace with other official buildings, and to the south is the main section of St James's Park. Near the east end at Trafalgar Square and Whitehall it is met by Horse Guards Road and Spring Gardens, near the west end at the Victoria Memorial it is met by the Constitution Hill roadway and the Spur Road to Buckingham Gate. It is closed to traffic on Saturdays, Sundays, public holidays and on ceremonial occasions. The Mall in its present form was developed in the 19th and 20th centuries from a carriageway through St James's Park, and given its red colouring in the 1950s.

== History ==
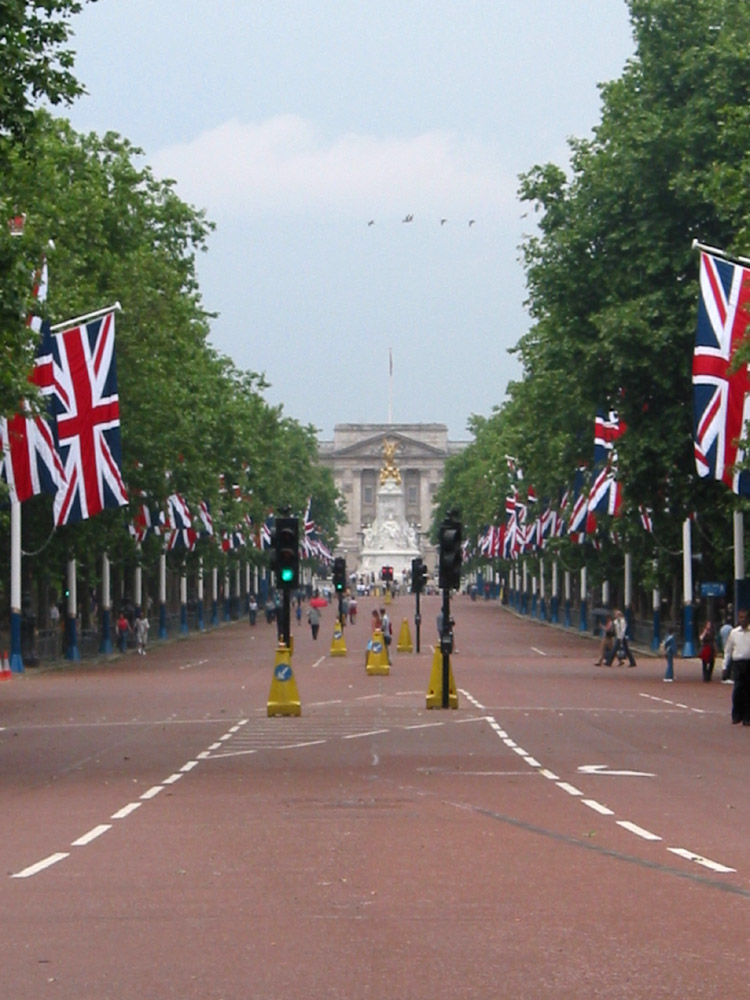
The Mall, looking towards Buckingham Palace (2003)

The Mall began as part of the landscaped grounds of St James's Palace, and when pall-mall became popular, as a field for playing the game. In the 17th and 18th centuries it was a fashionable promenade, bordered by trees. It was envisioned as a ceremonial route in the early 20th century, matching the creation of similar ceremonial routes in other cities such as Berlin, Mexico City, Oslo, Paris, Saint Petersburg, Vienna and Washington, D.C. These routes were intended to be used for major national ceremonies. As part of this development – designed by Aston Webb – a new façade was constructed for Buckingham Palace to face down The Mall, and the Victoria Memorial was erected.

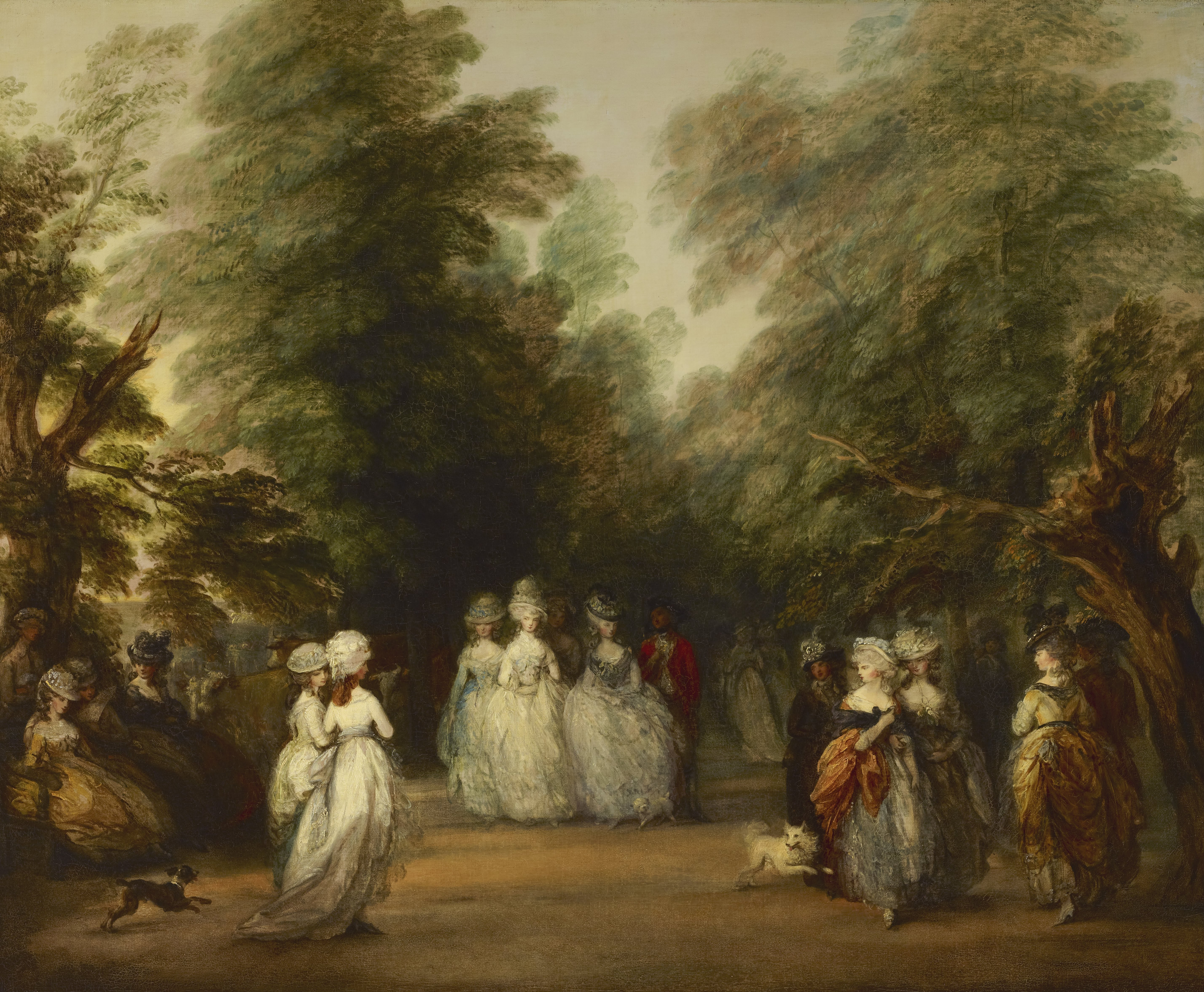
The Mall in St. James's Park by Thomas Gainsborough, 1783. At the time The Mall was part of St James's Park.

The Victoria Memorial is immediately before the gates of the Palace, whilst Admiralty Arch at the far end leads into Trafalgar Square. The length of The Mall from where it joins Constitution Hill at the Victoria Memorial end to Admiralty Arch is exactly 0.5 nautical miles (0.93 km; 0.58 mi). St. James's Park is on the south side of The Mall, opposite Green Park and St James's Palace, on the north side. Running off The Mall at its eastern end is Horse Guards Parade, where the Trooping the Colour ceremony is held.

The surface of The Mall has been coloured red since the 1950s giving the effect of a giant red carpet leading up to Buckingham Palace. This colour was obtained using synthetic iron oxide pigment from Deanshanger Oxide Works (Deanox), which was created using the Deanox Process devised by chemist Ernest Lovell. David Eccles, as Minister of Works from 1951 to 1954, chose the colour.

On Victory in Europe Day (8 May 1945), the Palace was the centre of British celebrations, with the King, Queen and Princess Elizabeth (the future queen) and Princess Margaret appearing on the balcony, with the Palace's blacked-out windows behind them, with the cheers from a vast crowd on The Mall.

During state visits, the monarch and the visiting head of state are escorted in a state carriage up The Mall and the street is decorated with Union Flags and the flags of the visiting head of state's country. During the Golden Jubilee celebrations of Queen Elizabeth II in 2002, over one million people packed The Mall to watch the public displays and the appearance of the Royal Family on the palace balcony.

Scheduled buses are not allowed to use The Mall and go past Buckingham Palace only by permission of the monarch. This has happened only twice in history; in 1927 and in 1950.

== Events ==
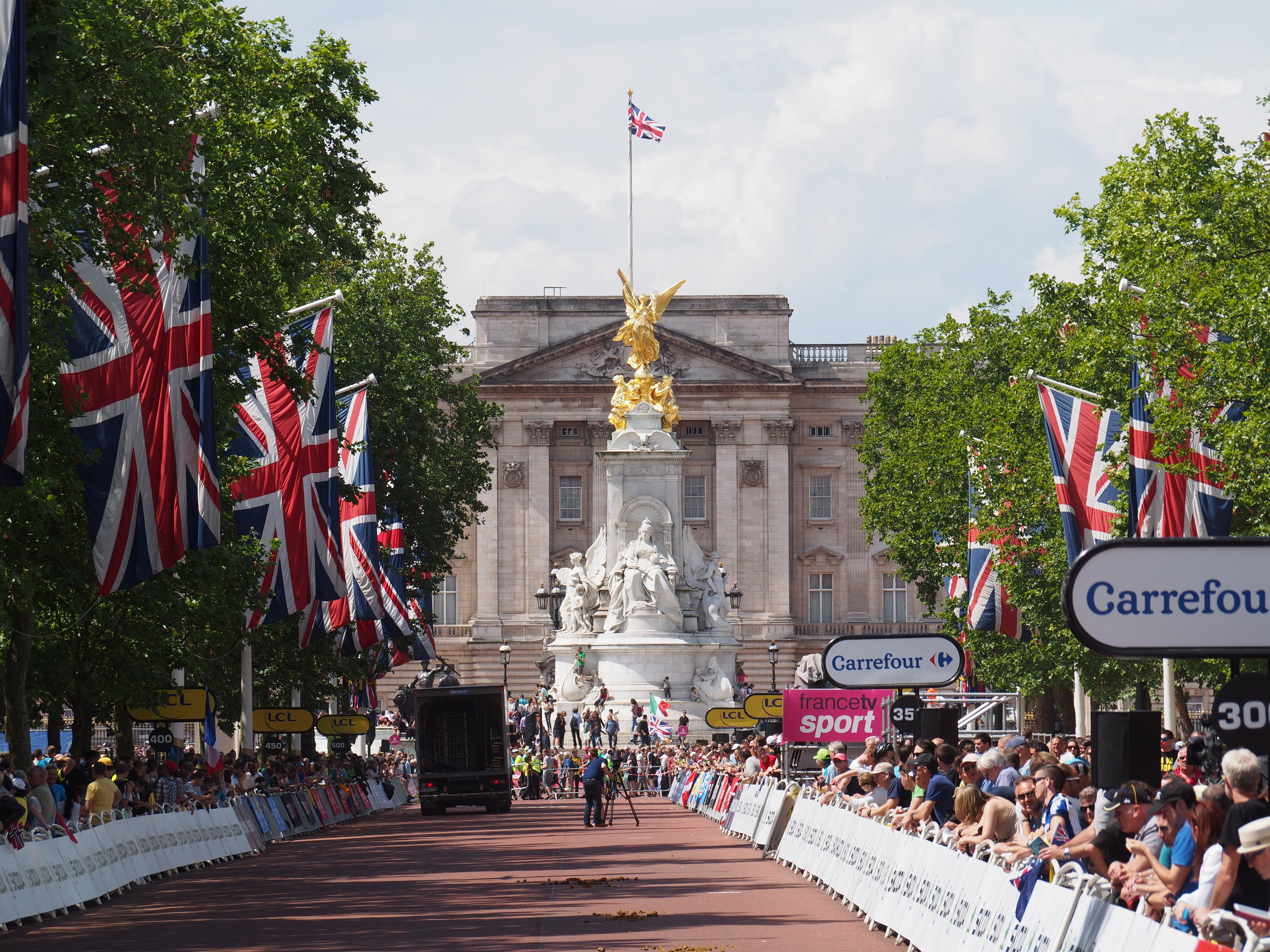
The Mall, during Le Tour 2014

The annual London Marathon finishes on The Mall. It was also the start and finish line for the marathon course, the road race and the race walks of the 2012 Olympic and Paralympic Games. The women's marathon took place on 5 August and the men's Olympic marathon on 12 August. The men's 20 km walk took place on 4 August, with the men's 50 km walk and women's 20 km walk took place on 11 August. The Paralympic marathons were held on 9 September. In recent years, The Mall has also been repeatedly used as the finishing line for UK cycling events, including the 2012 Olympics Road Races, the Ride London Prudential Classic in 2013, and stage 3 of the 2014 Tour de France. The opening ceremony for the 2019 Cricket World Cup was held on The Mall.

During the Trooping the Colour events and other big national events, The Mall is used.

== Starting pistol incident ==
In 1981, Marcus Sarjeant fired six blank shots from a starting pistol near Queen Elizabeth II as she and her entourage were making their way down the road on horseback for Trooping the Colour. Sarjeant was immediately apprehended and arrested.
