= The Close of the Battle of the Saintes =

Painting by Nicholas Pocock

- Artist: Nicholas Pocock
- Year: c. 1782
- Type: Seascape painting
- Medium: Oil on canvas
- Dimensions: 107 cm × 168.6 cm (42 in × 66.4 in)
- Location: City Museum and Art Gallery, Bristol

The Close of the Battle of the Saintes is a c. 1782 marine painting by the English artist Nicholas Pocock. It depicts the victory of the British Royal Navy against a French fleet at the Battle of the Saintes in the Caribbean. The battle, fought during the final year of the American War of Independence, resulted in a decisive triumph for the British led by Admiral Rodney.

The painting depicts the closing stages of the battle. The French flagship Ville de Paris is dismasted and captured and the French commander Admiral De Grasse was taken prisoner. it was one of two large paintings of the battle Pocock was commissioned to produce with the assistance of the shipbuilder James Martin Hilhouse, the other featuring the breaking of the line earlier in the battle.

The work was displayed at the Royal Academys Summer Exhibition of 1783 at London"s Somerset House. Today the painting is in the collection of the Bristol City Museum and Art Gallery, having been acquired in 1981.

== Bibliography ==
- Cordingly, David. Nicholas Pocock, 1740–1821. University of California Press 1986.
- Greenacre, Francis. Marine Artists of Bristol. University of California Press, 1982.
- Wright, Christopher, Gordon, Catherine May & Smith, Mary Peskett. British and Irish Paintings in Public Collections: An Index of British and Irish Oil Paintings by Artists Born Before 1870 in Public and Institutional Collections in the United Kingdom and Ireland. Yale University Press, 2006.
