= Percival Delivering Belisane from the Enchantment of Urma =

Painting by Henry Fuseli

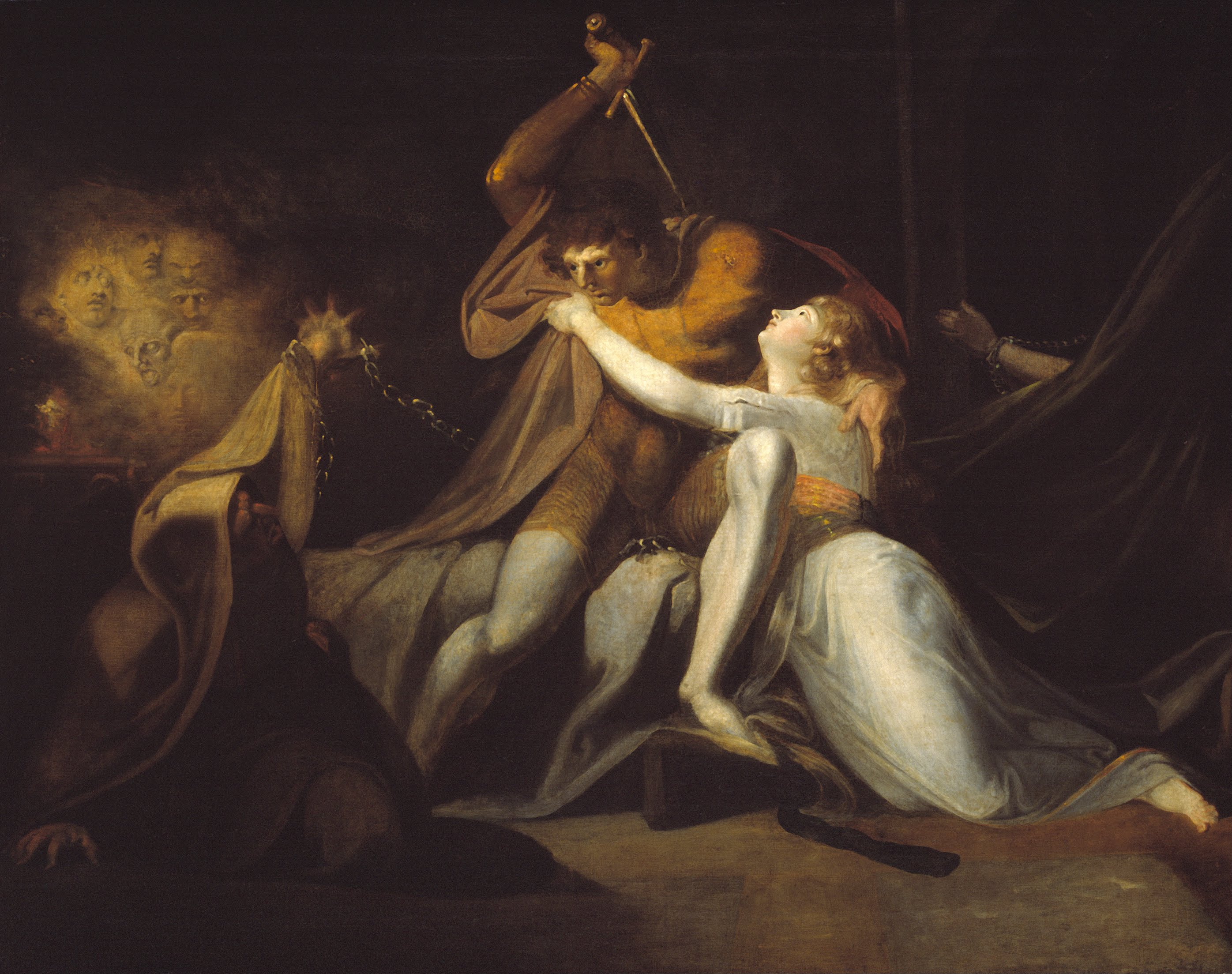
- Artist: Henry Fuseli
- Year: 1783
- Type: Oil on canvas, history painting
- Dimensions: 99.1 cm × 125.7 cm (39.0 in × 49.5 in)
- Location: Tate Britain; London

Percival Delivering Belisane from the Enchantment of Urma is an oil on canvas painting by the Swiss artist Henry Fuseli, from 1783. It is held at the Tate Britain, in London.

== History and description ==
It depicts a Gothic scene, where Percival awakes from his sleep to rescue the damsel Belasine from the wizard Urma. It was one of two paintings, along with the now lost Belisane and Percival Under the Enchantment of Urma of 1782, that the artist claimed to have based on the Provencal Tales of Kyot. This appears to be an entirely fictitious saga of Fuseli's own creation. Such inventions of supposedly real works were common in Gothic literature.

Long-settled in Britain where he was a member of the Royal Academy of Arts, Fuseli was known for his expressive paintings that formed part of the emerging Romantic movement that differed strongly from the dominant Neoclassicism of the period. This painting was displayed at the Royal Academy Exhibition of 1783 at Somerset House in London. Today it is in the collection of the Tate Britain, having been presented by the Art Fund in 1941.

== Bibliography ==
- Riccardi, Silvia. Dark Romanticism: Literature, Art, and the Body. Springer Nature, 2025.
