= Portrait of the Earl of Sandwich =

Painting by Thomas Gainsborough

The Earl of Sandwich
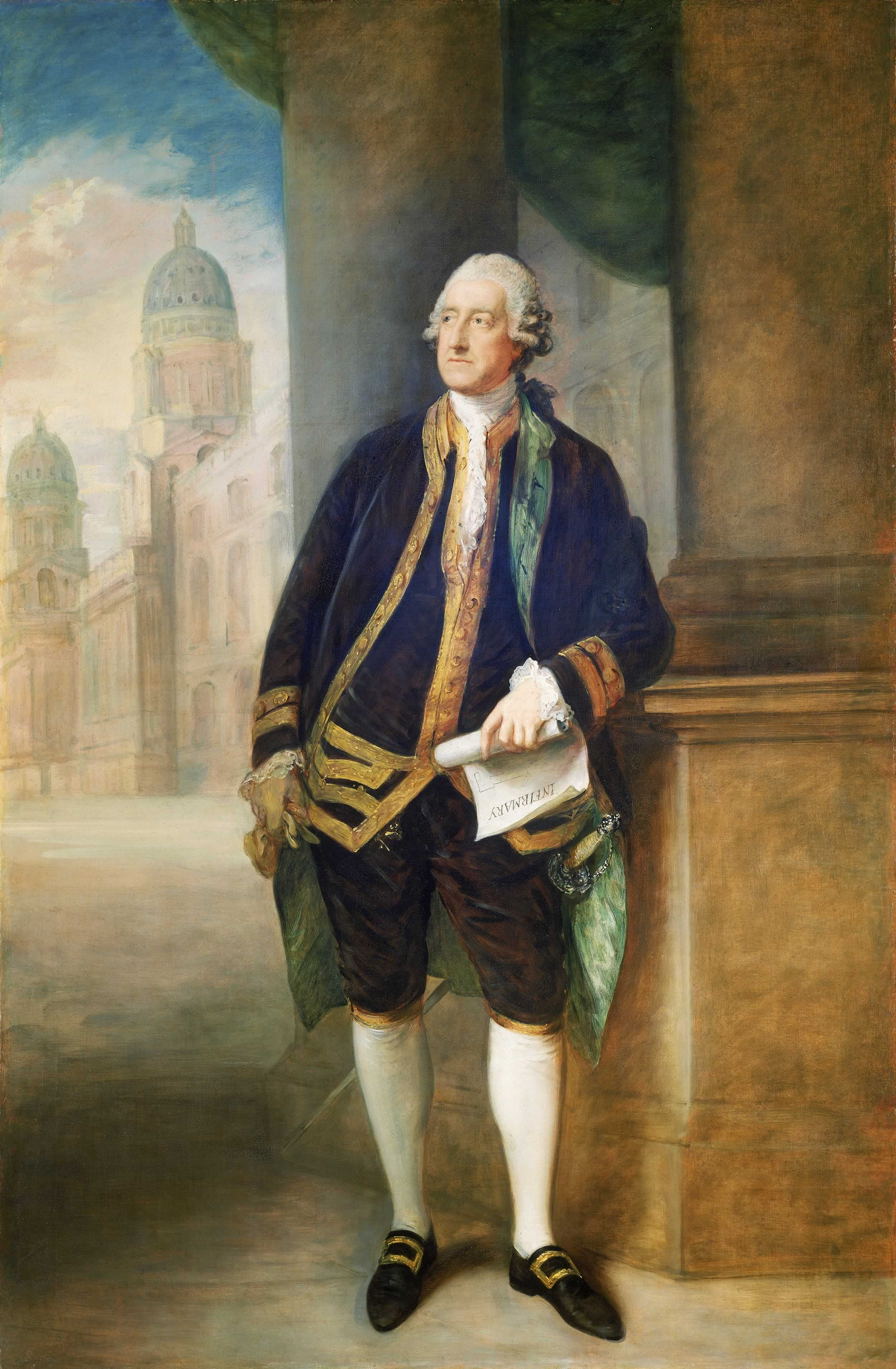
- Artist: Thomas Gainsborough
- Year: 1783
- Type: Oil on canvas, portrait
- Dimensions: 232.5 cm × 151.4 cm (91.5 in × 59.6 in)
- Location: National Maritime Museum; London

Portrait of the Earl of Sandwich is an oil on canvas painting by the English artist Thomas Gainsborough, from 1783. It is a full-length depiction of John Montagu, 4th Earl of Sandwich. It is held in the National Maritime Museum.

== History and description ==
Sandwich had recently left the post of First Lord of the Admiralty which he had held three times since 1748, having overseen British naval operations during the American Revolutionary War. Sandwich is shown against the backdrop of Greenwich Hospital, with his large two towers visible, while he holds a plan of James Stuart's design for the infirmary, completed in the 1760s during Sandwich's earlier term as First Lord.

It was commissioned from Gainsborough by the current governor of the hospital, Admiral Hugh Palliser, as a gesture of thanks to Sandwich for his political patronage.

A 1788 engraving by John Keyse Sherwin is in the collection of the National Portrait Gallery.

== Bibliography ==
- Bonehill, John. (ed.) Art for the Nation: The Oil Paintings Collections of the National Maritime Museum. National Maritime Museum, 2006.
- Whitley, William Thomas. Thomas Gainsborough. Smith, Elder & Company, 1915.
