= Romantic Landscape with Sheep at a Spring =

Painting by Thomas Gainsborough

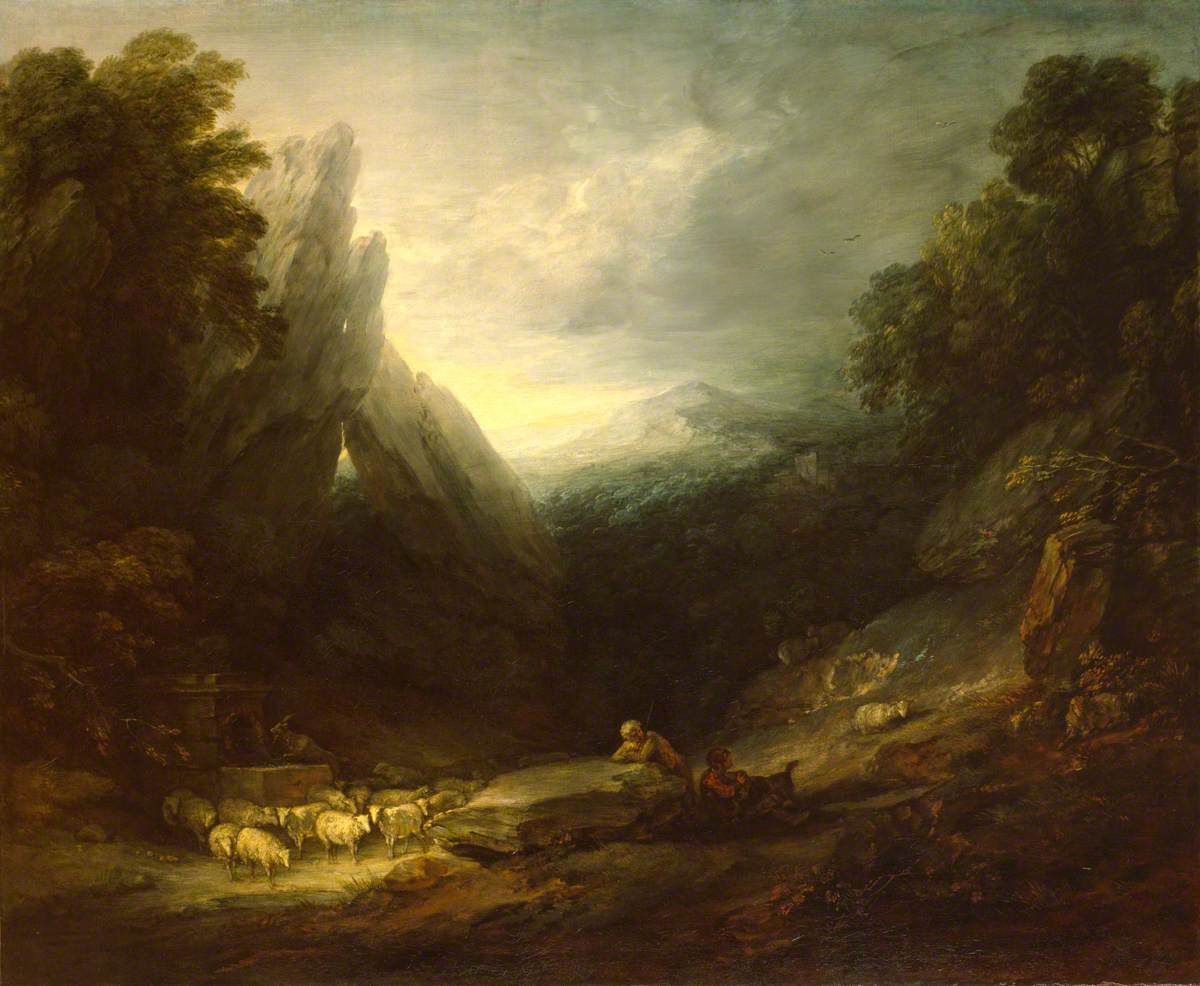
- Artist: Thomas Gainsborough
- Year: 1783
- Type: Oil on canvas, landscape painting
- Dimensions: 153.7 cm × 186.7 cm (60.5 in × 73.5 in)
- Location: Royal Academy; London

Romantic Landscape with Sheep at a Spring is a c.1783 landscape painting by the British artist Thomas Gainsborough. Anticipating the emerging Romantic movement, it depicts shepherds resting with the flock in a dark hollow by a spring. More dramatic and larger than Gainsborough's previous landscapes, it was likely inspired by visits he had recently made to the Lake District and West Country. In 1799 it was donated to the Royal Academy of Arts in London by Gainsborough's daughter Margaret, to function as his diploma work which as a founder member he had never been required to give during his lifetimes. The nineteenth century critic John Ruskin both praised the painting "Nothing can be more attractively luminous or aerial than the distance of the Gainsborough" but criticised it for its lack of naturalism which he valued as important.

== Bibliography ==
- Lister, Raymond. British Romantic Art. Bell, 1973.
- Rao, Eleonora, Chialant, Maria Teresa & Bottalico, Michele (ed.) Literary Landscapes, Landscape in Literature. Carocci, 2007.
