= The Mall in St. James's Park =

Painting by Thomas Gainsborough

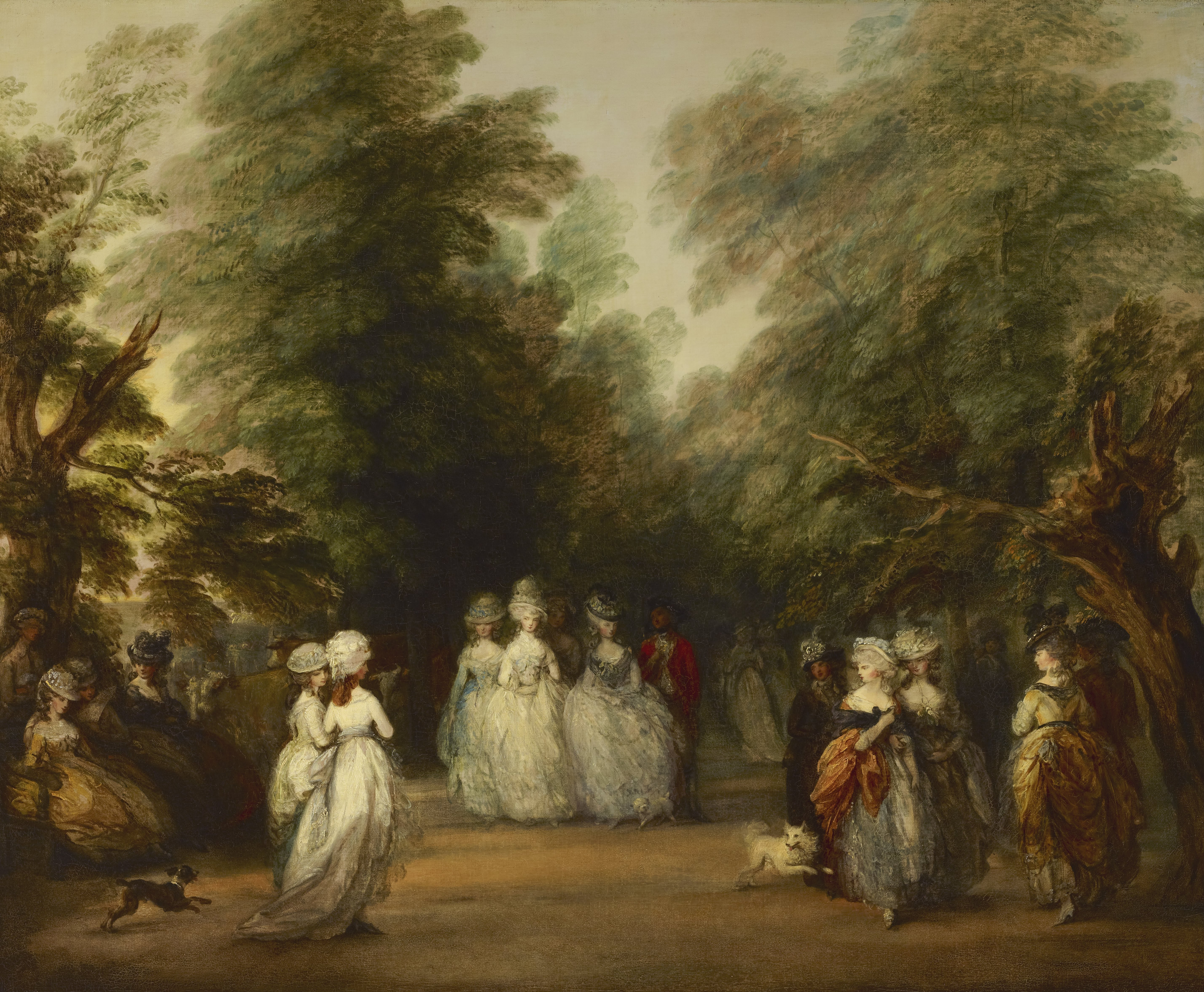
- Artist: Thomas Gainsborough
- Year: 1783
- Type: Oil on canvas, landscape painting
- Dimensions: 120.6 cm × 147 cm (47.5 in × 58 in)
- Location: Frick Collection; New York City

The Mall in St. James's Park is an oil on canvas painting by the British artist Thomas Gainsborough, from 1783.

It features a view of St James's Park, in London, displaying a view of fashionable figures in The Mall, near to the Royal residence at Buckingham House. Today the painting is in the Frick Collection, in New York, having been acquired in 1916.

== Bibliography ==
- Dunning, William. Changing Images of Pictorial Space: History of Spatial Illusion in Painting. Syracuse University Press, 1991.
- Hamilton, James. Gainsborough: A Portrait. Hachette UK, 2017.
