= Marie Antoinette with a Rose =

Painting by Élisabeth Vigée Le Brun

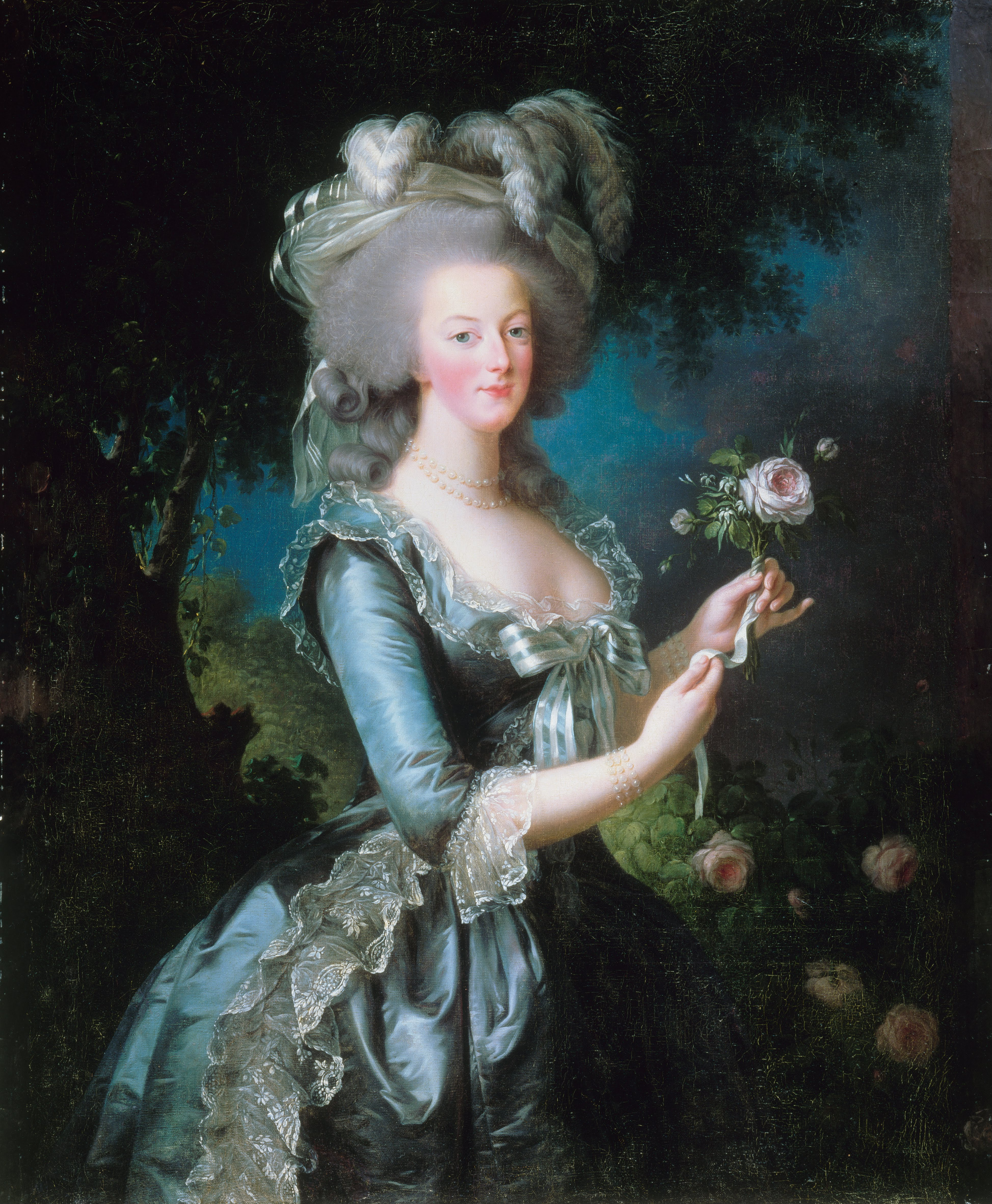
- Artist: Élisabeth Vigée Le Brun
- Year: 1783
- Medium: Oil on canvas
- Subject: Marie Antoinette
- Dimensions: 116.8 cm × 88.9 cm (46.0 in × 35.0 in)
- Location: Palace of Versailles, Versailles

Marie Antoinette with a Rose, also known as Marie-Antoinette with the Rose (French: Marie-Antoinette dit « à la Rose »), is an oil painting by the French artist Élisabeth Vigée Le Brun. It was painted in 1783, and is in the collection of the Palace of Versailles. As of November 2022, it is hanging in the ante-dining room of the Petit Trianon.

== Description ==
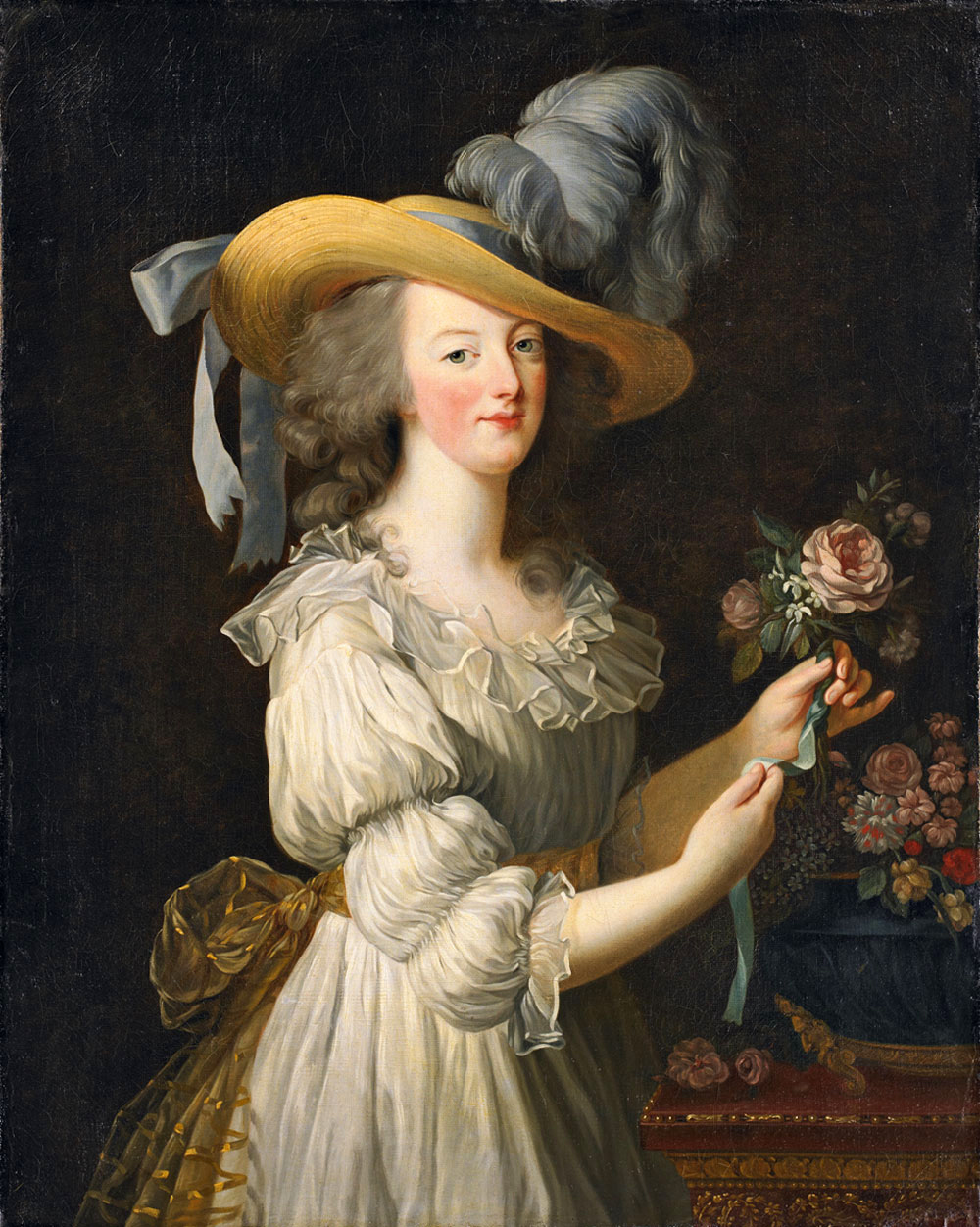
Marie Antoinette en gaulle (Marie Antoinette in a Chemise Dress), a 1783 portrait of the queen in a "muslin" dress by Louise Élisabeth Vigée Le Brun

Élisabeth Vigée Le Brun, the court painter of Queen Marie Antoinette of France, painted Marie Antoinette with a Rose in 1783, six years prior to the outbreak of the French Revolution and ten years prior to the eventual beheading of Louis XVI and the queen. Vigée Le Brun was enrolled at the Académie Royale de Peinture et de Sculpture on 31 May 1783 and in the same year she was commissioned by Marie Antoinette to present a portrait of herself for the upcoming Salon. She portrayed the queen wearing a dress that looked like a chemise.

The chemise-like dress was adapted from the Parisian fashion dressmaker Rose Bertin, the queen's favourite, during the time when the queen lived at the Petit Trianon, out of the palace. Visitors to the Salon were shocked because they thought it unbecoming to portray a queen of France in this kind of dress. It was also made of imported cotton instead of supporting the struggling French silk industry. After that, the portrait was removed from the Salon.

Vigée Le Brun immediately painted a new portrait to be exhibited before the event ended. The pose did not change in the new portrait. The queen is dressed in a classic blue-grey silk dress with a large striped ribbon bow and rich pearl jewelry, which were considered more suitable for a queen of France. The artist intentionally portrayed the queen in a silk dress to show the queen's support for the silk-weavers of Lyon.

The first portrait, in a chemise, seems to have been lost, but the artist produced five subsequent versions with variations in costume, for example with a hat or in a muslin dress.
