= William Henry Pyne =

English painter

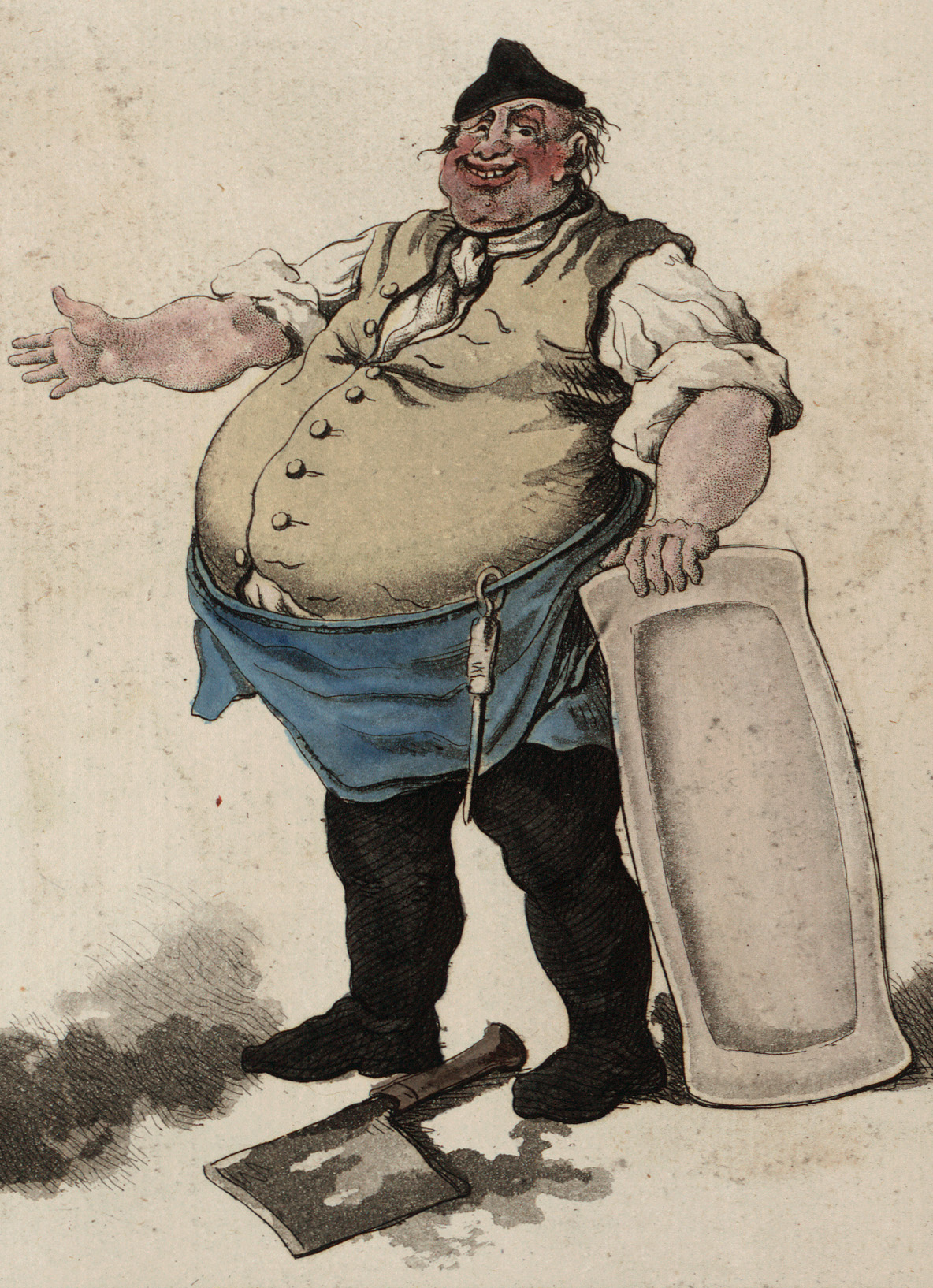
Detail showing the butcher from An ocean of motion about Spanish commotions or the windy explosion of pot-hous oration (see gallery)

William Henry Pyne (1769 in London – 29 May 1843 in London) was an English writer, illustrator and painter, who also wrote under the name of Ephraim Hardcastle. He trained at the drawing academy of Henry Pars in London. He first exhibited at the Royal Academy in 1790. He specialized in picturesque settings including groups of people rendered in pen, ink and watercolour. Pyne was one of the founders of the Royal Watercolour Society in 1804.

== Works ==
Pyne's book The Costume of Great Britain, including 60 paintings of professional and working-class men and women and scenes from everyday life (published by William Miller in 1805), attracted the attention of the publisher Rudolph Ackermann, and Pyne was to engrave and write for many of his projects, including writing the text for the first two volumes of the very successful illustration-centred The Microcosm of London.

He was his own publisher for The History of the Royal Residences (1816–1819), a large illustrated book with 100 engravings of the exteriors and interior decorations and furnishings of Windsor Castle, St. James's Palace, Carlton House, Kensington Palace and Hampton Court Palace. It caused financial difficulties for him – he was imprisoned for debt more than once, and died a poor man in 1843.

As Ephraim Hardcastle, he wrote gossipy columns on art for the Literary Gazette, which in 1824 were collected in 2 volumes as Wine and Walnuts, or After-dinner Chit-chat. He wrote for other journals, and in 1825 published a novel The Twenty-ninth of May, or Rare Doings at the Restoration.

Pyne's watercolours are in major museum collections, such as the Royal Collection and the British Museum. His son, George Pyne (1800–01 - 1884), was also a painter in watercolour, writer on drawing and perspective.

== Gallery ==
An ocean of motion about Spanish commotions or the windy explosion of pot-hous oration, 1796–1808

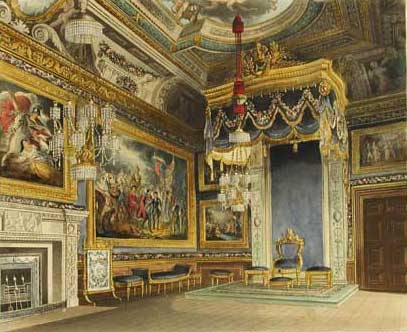
The King's Audience Chamber at Windsor Castle, from The History of the Royal Residences

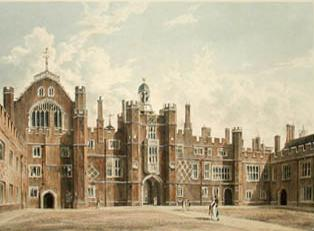
The quadrangle at Hampton Court

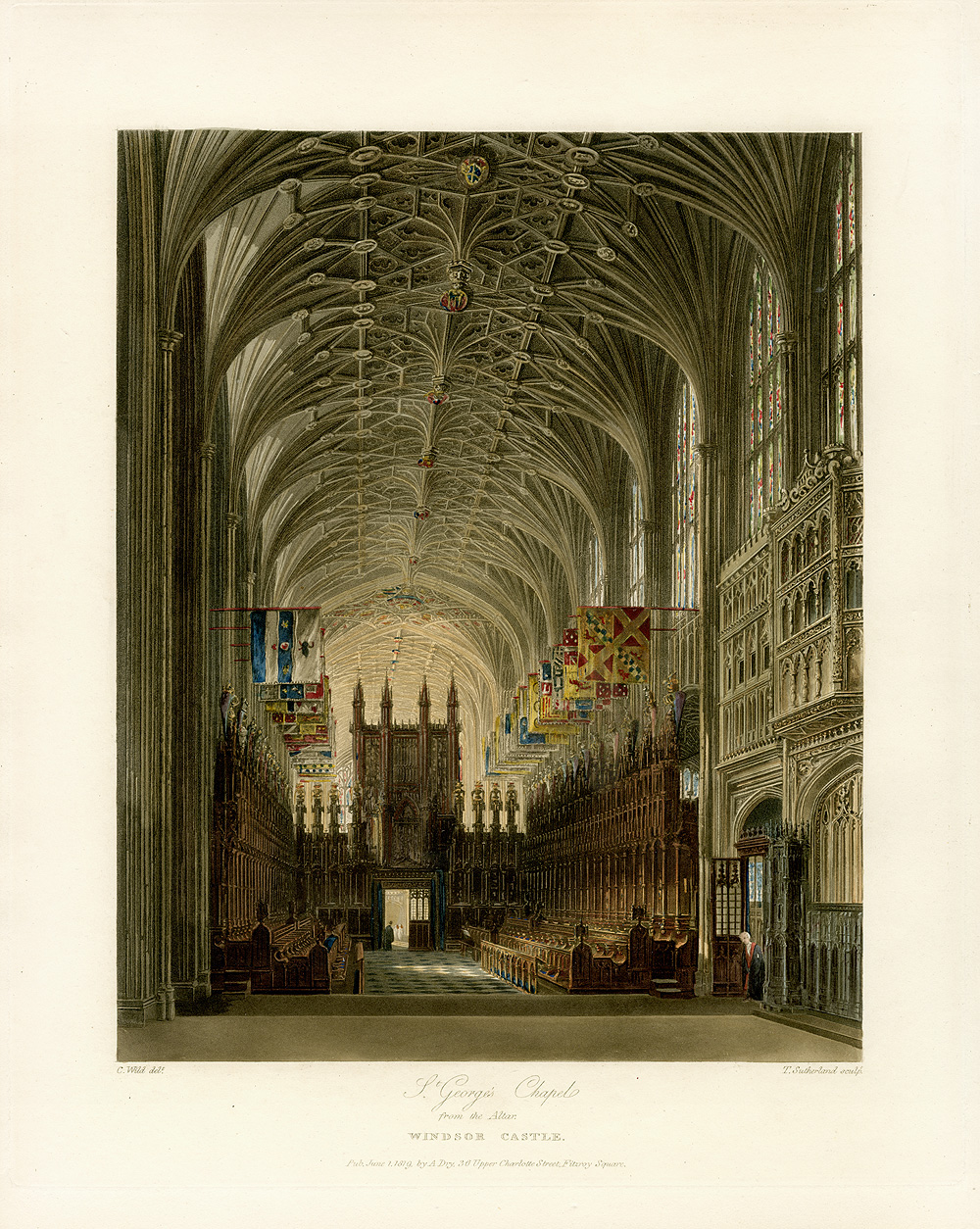
St George's Chapel, Windsor Castle from the Altar, from Pyne's Royal Residences, 1819.

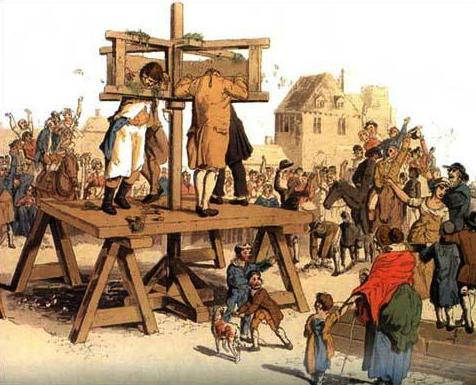
The Pillory, from The Costume of Great Britain, 1805

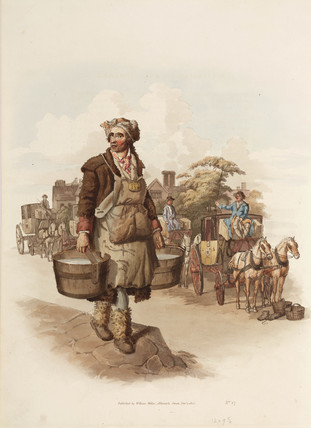
Waterman to a Coach Stand, from The Costume of Great Britain, 1808

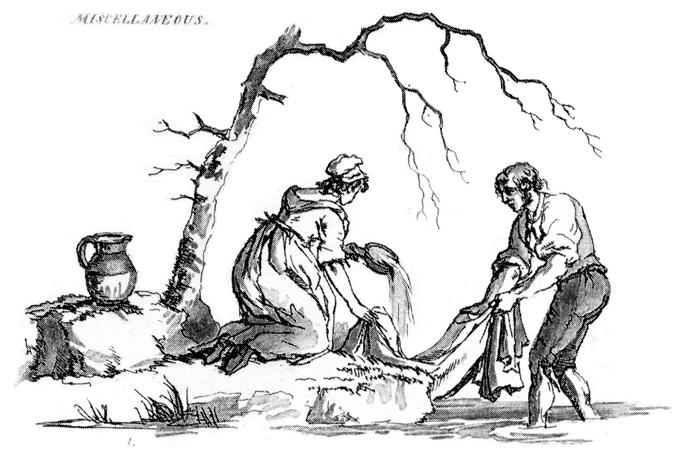
Man and woman washing linen in a brook, from Microcosm, 1806
