= Constance Schweich =

British philanthropist and patron of the arts (1869–1951)

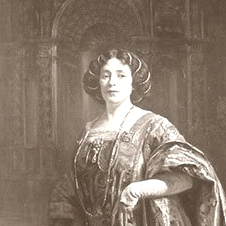
Constance in 1911 in Florentine dress by her husband, Sigismund Goetze

Constance Schweich (1869 – 12 February 1951; married name: Constance Goetze) was a British philanthropist and patron of the arts.

== Early life ==
Schweich was born in Paris the only daughter of Leopold Schweich and Philippina Schweich, née Mond (1840–1873). Her mother died when she was a child and her father before she reached maturity. By 1894 she was living in England with her uncle Ludwig Mond.

In 1907, at the age of 38, she married the artist Sigismund Goetze, whose sister Violet Goetze was married to her cousin Alfred Mond, and they purchased as their marital residence Grove House, a villa in Regent's Park built by Decimus Burton, at auction.

== Philanthropy ==
In 1907, in memory of her father, Constance made a substantial endowment to the British Academy to create a fund that would be "devoted to the furtherance of research in the archaeology, art, history, languages and literature of Ancient Civilisation, with reference to Biblical Study", which led to the first of the annual Schweich Lectures on Biblical Archaeology in 1908. Subsequent lectures have been published as a series by the Oxford University Press.

In 1925, two years after the death of her aunt Frida Mond, the wife of Ludwig Mond, Constance endowed the Frida Mond Studentship at the University of London to promote literary studies amongst graduates in arts in her memory.

Following the unexpected death of her husband in 1939, she made a bequest of a number of artworks and ten manuscripts from his estate to the Fitzwilliam Museum, including Ecce Homo by Guido Reni (painted in 1639). In accordance with his will, she also set up the Constance Fund, which he had originally intended to be established in order to commemorate her memory through the gifts of sculpture to parks in London, and which she now administered to commemorate his memory. Under her direction, the Constance Fund commissioned the Triton and Dryads fountain, designed by William McMillan in 1936, which was at last installed in Queen Mary's Gardens in 1950 with an inscription commemorating Goetze as a "Painter[,] Lover of the Arts and Benefactor of this Park". The Constance Fund also commissioned the Diana in the Trees Fountain in Green Park, which was completed after her death and was presented to the Minister of Works by her niece Countess May Cippico. The fund's final commission, in 1963, was the Joy of Life fountain by T. B. Huxley-Jones in Hyde Park (renamed in 2001/2002 as the Four Winds Fountain).

Following her death in 1951, her estate was valued at some £431,501. Her will, proved 4 April 1951, established the Constance Goetze Bequest to the Royal Academy of Music, which supports graduates of exceptional talent in acquiring a good instrument and meeting the expense of those graduates' first recital in a London concert hall.
