= Burbury =

Name list

Burbury is a surname. Notable people with the surname include:

- Alfred Burbury (1865–1944), Australian politician
- Charlotte Burbury (1832–1895), British educationist
- Edwina Burbury (1810s–1870), British writer
- Frederick Burbury (1861–1956), Australian politician
- George Burbury (born 1992), Australian rules footballer
- Samuel Hawksley Burbury (1831–1911), British mathematician
- William Burbury (1836–1905), Australian politician

== See also ==
- Barberry
- Barbary
- Barbery
- Burberry
