= Diana Fountain =

The Diana Fountain may refer to:

- The Diana, Princess of Wales Memorial Fountain, in Hyde Park, London, England
- The Diana Fountain, Bushy Park, in Bushy Park, London, England
- The Diana Fountain, Green Park, in Green Park, London, England
- The Huntress Diana Fountain, in Mexico City, Mexico

== See also ==
- Fountain of Diana
