= Joy of Life (fountain) =

Fountain in London

Coordinates: 51.508502°N 0.155890°W

- Artist: T. B. Huxley-Jones
- Completion date: 1963
- Location: Hyde Park, London

Joy of Life is a fountain in Hyde Park in London. It stands just west of the rough midpoint of Park Lane.

== History and description ==
The fountain was the last work donated by the Constance Fund, a fund set up by Constance Schweich to provide public sculpture in London. With Constance dying in 1951, the committee members wished to use the rest of the funds for a final piece. The site was chosen, replacing the Boy and Dolphin fountain, for the expected widening of Park Lane. In 1957, a select competition was organised between sculptors David McFall, Sydney Harpley, Charles Wheeler and T. B. Huxley-Jones but it was eventually decided to open the competition to all sculptors born in the UK. Huxley-Jones was eventually chosen as the winner and his design selected. It consists of a stone basin with a male and female bronze figure dancing at its centre surrounded by little boys representing the Four Winds.

Chairman of the Constance fund May Cippico hoped for the Queen Mother to unveil the fountain but with inadequate advance notification it was not possible. It was instead unveiled by Minister of Works Geoffrey Rippon on the 25th of June 1963.

In the 1960s, the West Wind figure was stolen, and Huxley-Jones's widow Gwyneth Holt agreed to provide a replacement. The establishment of the Princess of Wales Memorial Walk in 2000 saw the basin of the fountain changed. In 2008, Marie Curie Cancer Care used the fountain for a flower display to mark their 60th anniversary.
