= Norman and Dawbarn =

British architectural firm

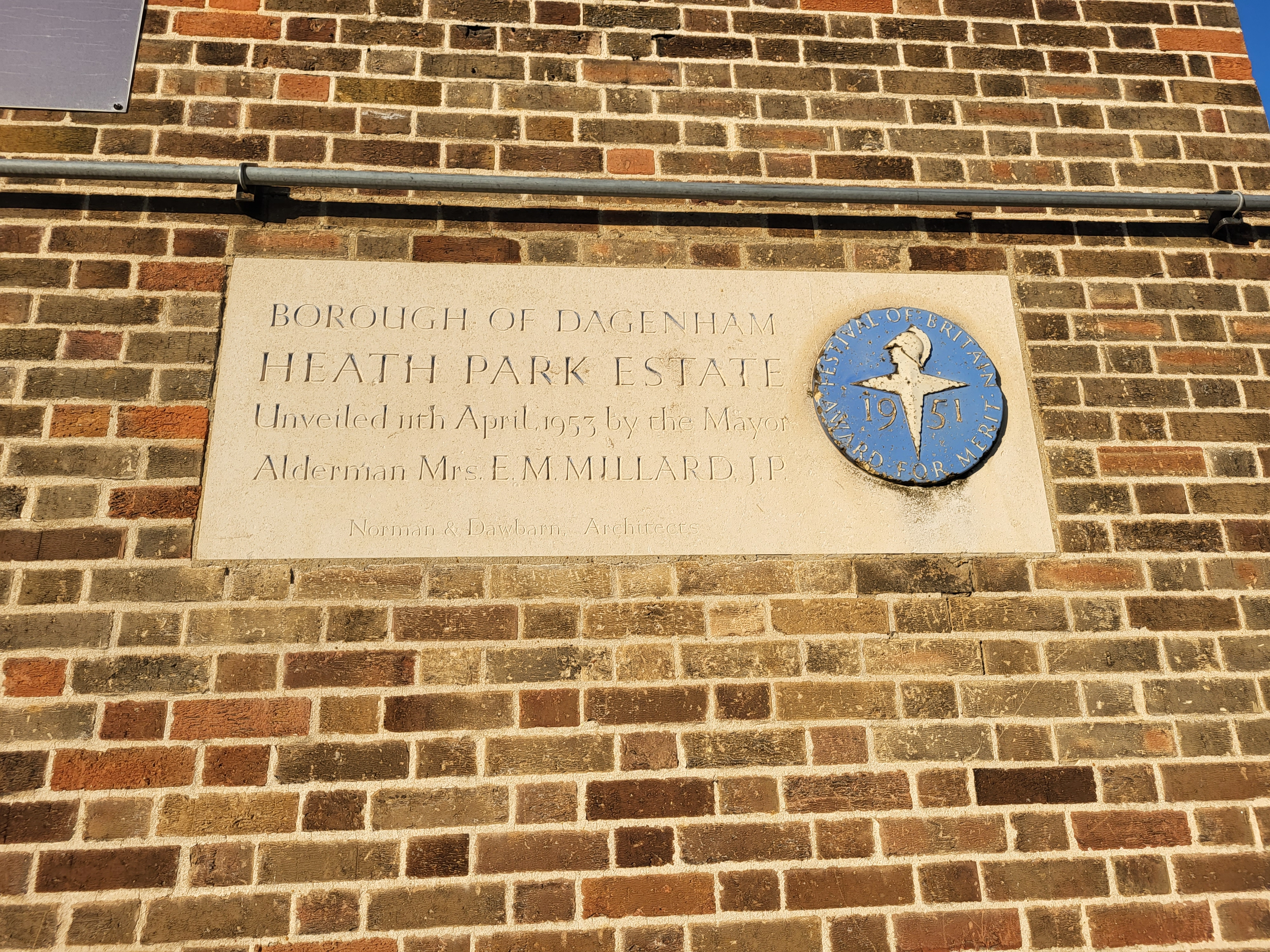
1953 Festival of Britain Merit Plaque for the Heath Park Estate, Dagenham, designed by Norman and Dawbarn.

Norman and Dawbarn (styled Norman & Dawbarn, and later, Norman + Dawbarn) was a British architectural and engineering practice, established in 1934.

== History ==
The practice was formed by Graham Dawbarn and Nigel Norman in 1934. The practice was preceded by Norman, Muntz & Dawbarn, formed with Alan Muntz.

In 2005 the practice was acquired by Capita Symonds following the collapse into administration. It traded as a subsidiary Capita Norman + Dawbarn until it was merged into Capita Architecture in 2007, though the name continues to be used in some international markets.

== Notable projects ==
- BBC Television Centre – Designed 1949, built 1953 to 1960
- University of Malta campus, Msida, Malta – Designed 1961, built 1964 to 1970
- Budhanilkantha School, Nepal – Completion 1973

== Notable staff ==
- Bill Bradfield
- Gertrude Leverkus
- Michael Manser
