= Helios (statue) =

1960 statue by T. B. Huxley-Jones

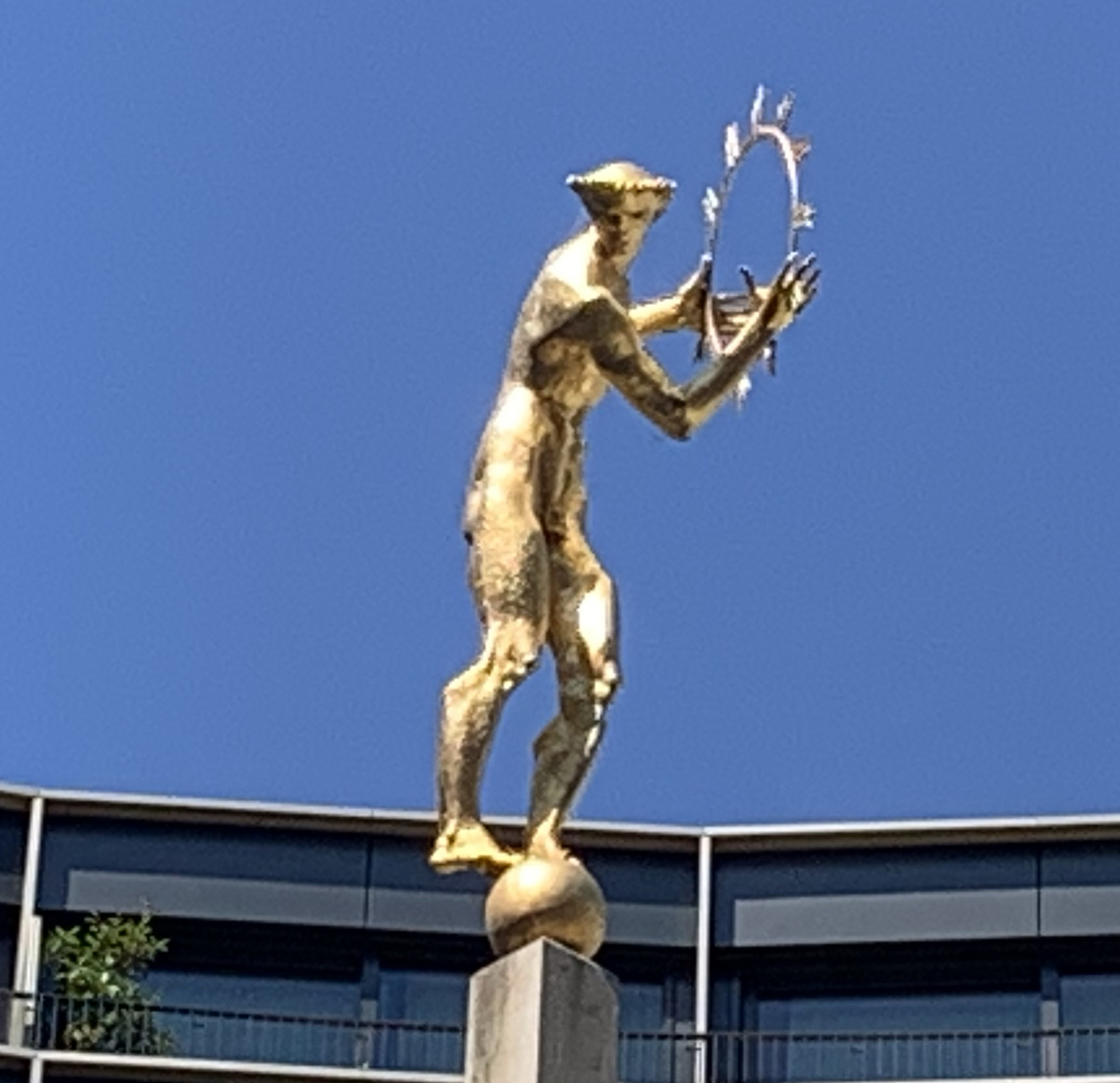
- Helios Statue White City
- Artist: T. B. Huxley-Jones
- Type: Sculpture
- Medium: Bronze, gold
- Subject: Helios
- Dimensions: 3 metres cm
- Location: White City, London

Helios is a three-metre high bronze, gilded sculpture created by T. B. Huxley-Jones in 1960, located at Television Centre in London, part of the Helios Building, a listed building in White City. The statue was restored and returned to the site in 2017.

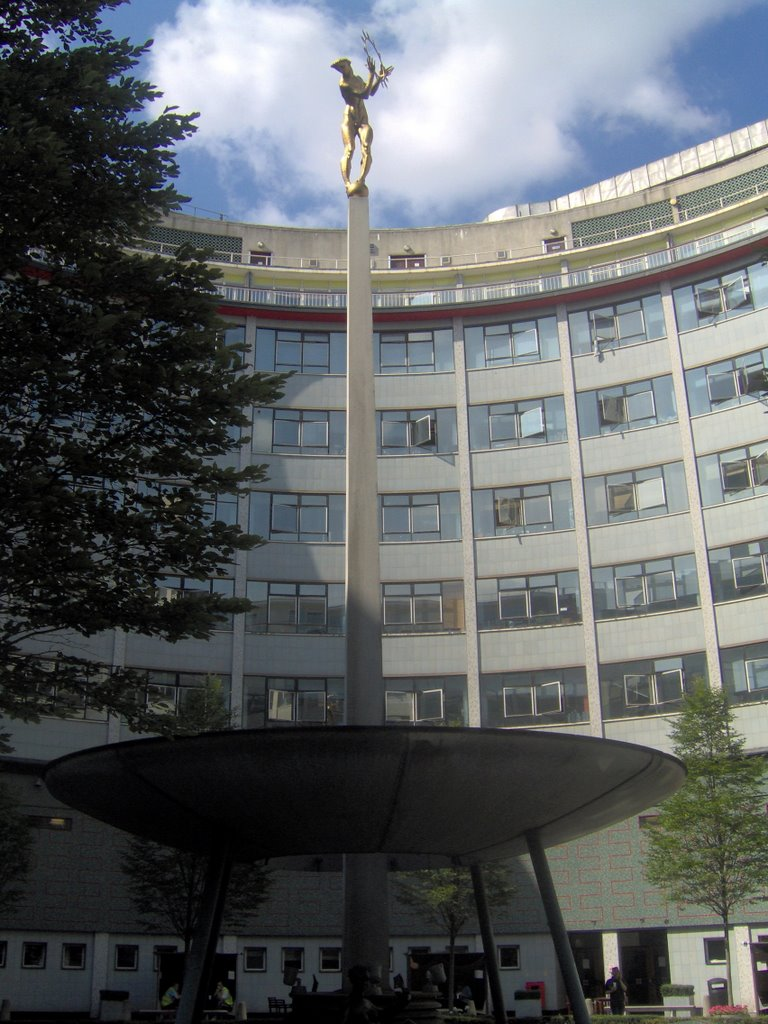
"Helios" in its setting

== History ==
=== 1960s ===
Helios was designed and created by the sculptor T. B. Huxley-Jones. It was cast in Cheltenham by H. H. Martyn & Co. It stood atop the central column in the rotunda at Television Centre in White City since the BBC headquarters opened in 1960. The sculpture is named after the Greek god Helios, personification of the sun, and was intended to represent the radiation of the light of television around the globe.

=== 2000s ===
Helios was cleaned and restored in 2017 and was returned to the newly refurbished Television Centre.
