= Nuffield Lodge =

Villa in Regent's Park, London, England

Coordinates: 51.530516°N 0.166914°W

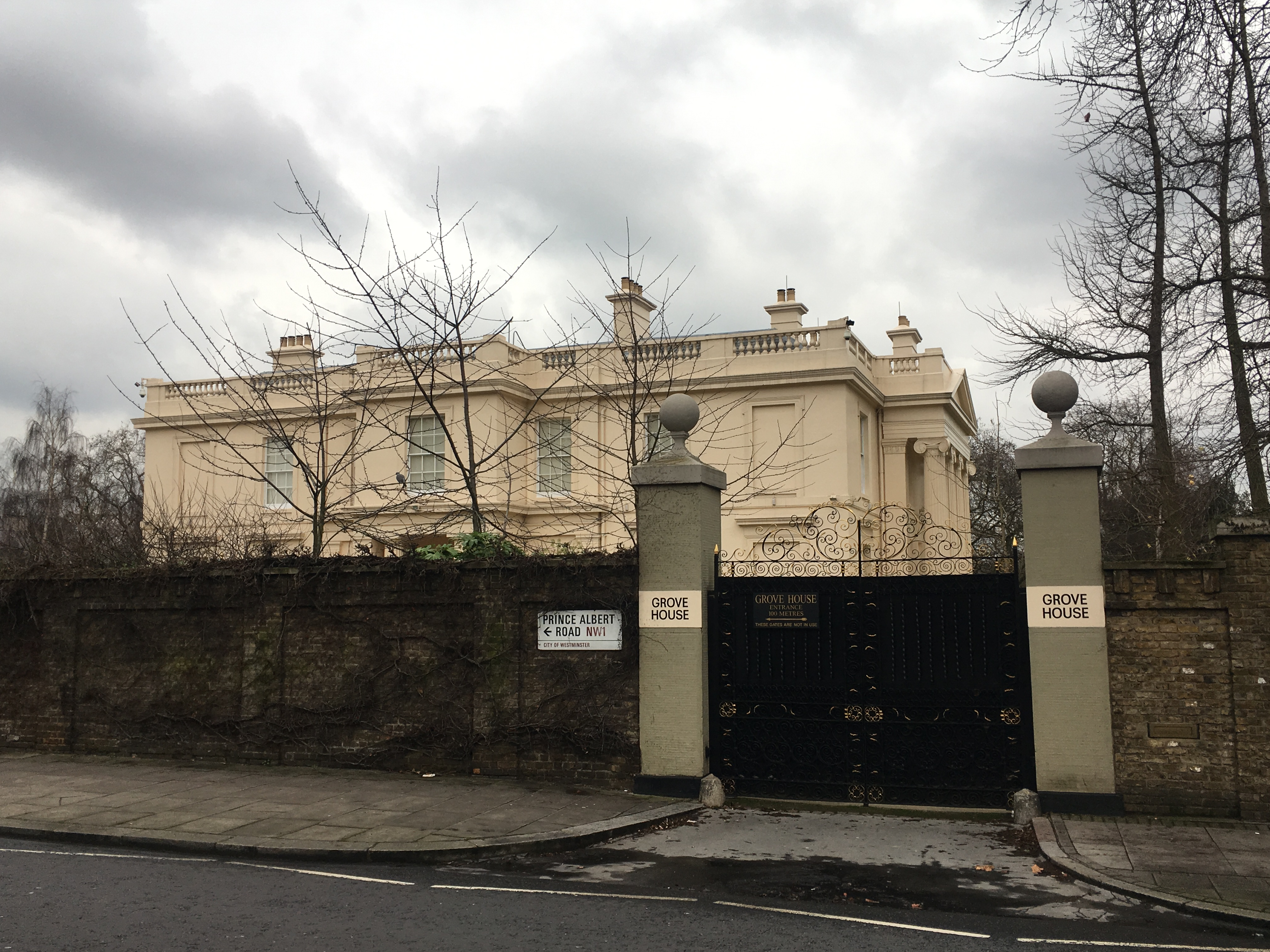
Nuffield Lodge from Prince Albert Road in January 2018

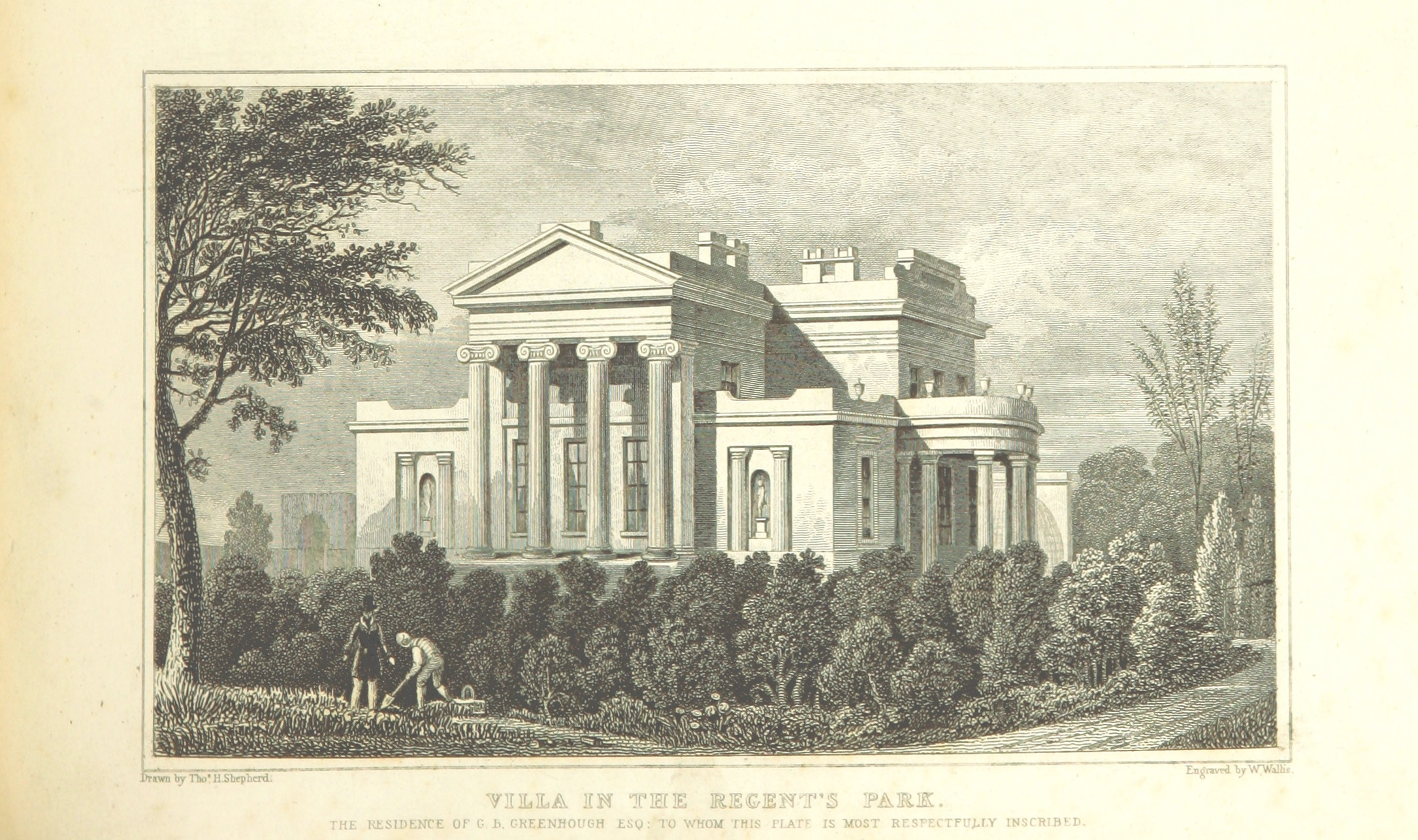
Grove Lodge, 1828

Nuffield Lodge is a house on Prince Albert Road, Regent's Park, London, England. It is Grade I listed. Both the house and its gardens fall within Regent's Park, which is Grade I listed on the Register of Historic Parks and Gardens. It is owned by the Sultan of Oman.

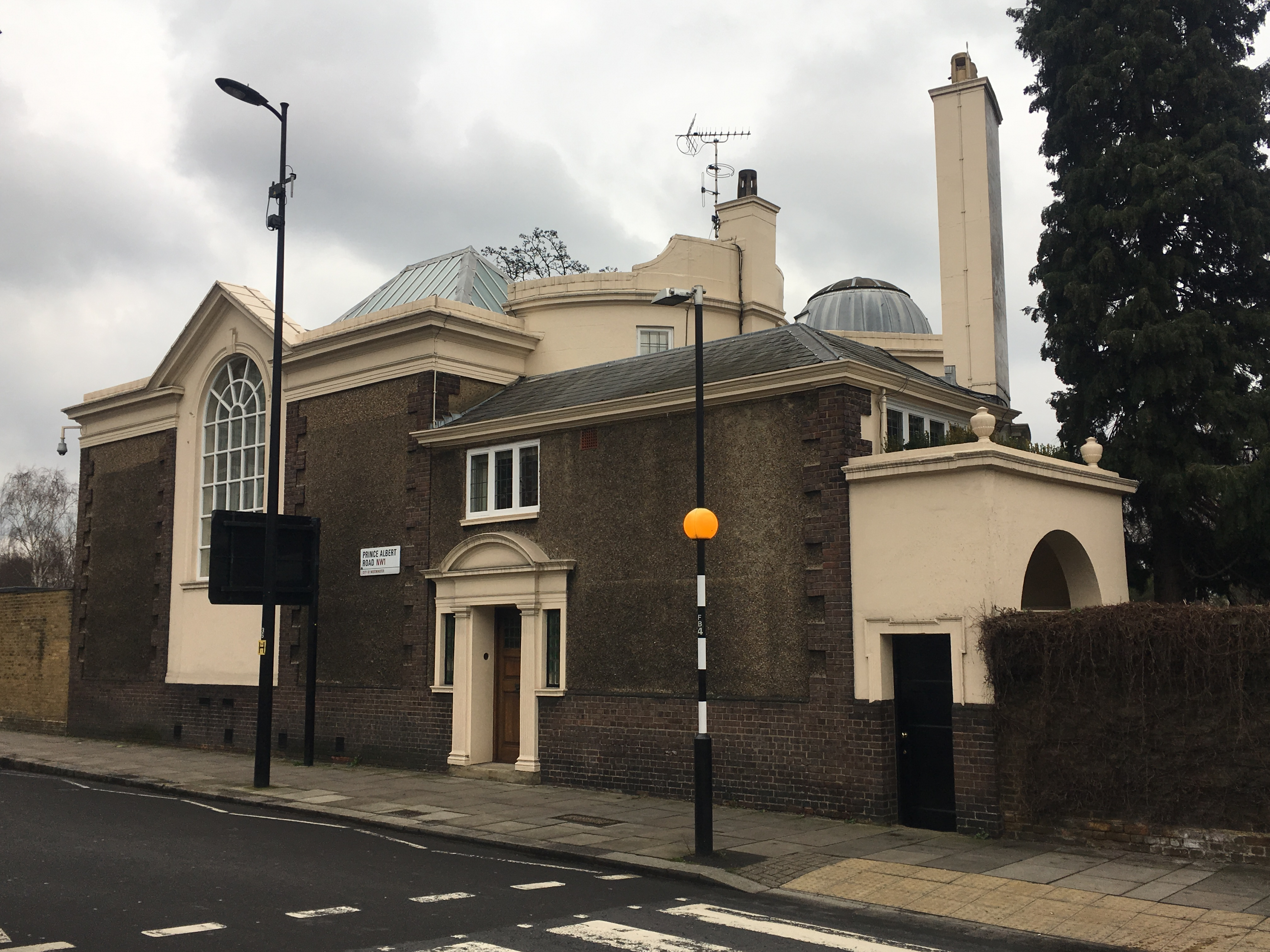
Nuffield Lodge's studio stable block in January 2018

== History ==
The villa was built from 1822 to 1824 as Grove House, and designed by the architect Decimus Burton as a bachelor residence for the geologist George Bellas Greenough (1778-1855). On the death of Greenough, the lease passed to Francis Smedley, the High Bailiff of Westminster, and then to his son the author Francis Edward Smedley and following his death in 1864 his cousin, Menella Bute Smedley, who had cared for him and acted as his private secretary continued to reside in the property until her death 1877.

The family connection was maintained by Thomas Greer (MP) who occupied the house from Christmas 1878 to his death in 1905. In 1907, the Greer family moved back to Ireland and sold the property by auction to Sigismund Goetze (1866-1939) who painted the interior murals.

In 1952, it was bought by the Nuffield Foundation, and renamed Nuffield Lodge. The Nuffield Foundation gave up the lease in 1986, and it became a private residence and reverted to the name Grove House. In 2014, the roof was removed and replaced. It was owned by the Sultan of Oman, Qaboos bin Said, until his death in January 2020, when he was succeeded by Haitham bin Tariq.

== Design ==
Nuffield Lodge's stable block was built by Burton c.1824 and was converted into an artist's studio for Goetze in 1909 by Sidney Tatchell. It is Grade II listed, and features stucco ornamentation in its interior. The archway connecting the studio stable block and the Palm house is listed Grade II.

The palm house in the grounds of the lodge is Grade II* listed, and was also designed by Burton. The palm house was designed to form a screen along with the stabling against "unpleasant objects" in the villa's environment. The Historic England heritage listing describes the palm house as "one of Burton's first experiments in the structural use of iron and glass".
