= Menella Bute Smedley =

English novelist, poet and translator

- Born: 1820; England
- Died: May 25, 1877 (aged 56–57); Grove Lodge, Regent's Park, London
- Occupations: Novelist, poet, translator
- Known for: The Maiden Aunt; The Story of Queen Isabel; translation of "The Shepherd of the Giant Mountains"
- Relatives: Lewis Carroll (distant relative); Frank Smedley (cousin)

Menella Bute Smedley (1820–1877) was a novelist and poet. A relative of Lewis Carroll, she wrote some minor novels and books of poems, including the anonymous, The Story of Queen Isabel, and Other Verses, 1863.

She translated the old German ballad "The Shepherd of the Giant Mountains" into English blank verse in 1846. Roger Lancelyn Green in the Times Literary Supplement on 1 March 1957, and later in The Lewis Carroll Handbook (1962), suggested that Carroll’s "Jabberwocky" may have been inspired by this work. Peter Lucas suggested in particular that verses 2-6 of "Jabberwocky" were a loose parody.

Her first novel, The Maiden Aunt, originally appeared in Sharpe's London Magazine under the pen name "S.M." In 1848 and 1849, it was published as a single volume, in both England and the United States, and was reprinted in 1856.

In addition to writing poetry and fiction, she also provided material for parliamentary reports on pauper schools.

She was the daughter of the Rev. Edward Smedley, and for many years lived with her cousin Frank Smedley, acting as his housekeeper and secretary. She died at their home Grove Lodge in Regent's Park, London on 25 May 1877 and was buried at West Norwood Cemetery.
