= Sigismund Goetze =

English painter and philanthropist (1866–1939)

Sigismund Christian Hubert Goetze (24 October 1866 – 24 October 1939) was an English painter and philanthropist, born in London.

== Early life ==
Goetze was the son of Rosina Hariet (née Bentley; d. 1877) and James D. Goetze (d. 1911). His sister Violet married the politician Alfred Mond, 1st Baron Melchett. He was educated first at University College School, then received a scholarship to study at the Slade School of Fine Art. He entered the Royal Academy Schools in 1885 and from 1888 was exhibiting regularly at the Royal Academy and at the Paris Salon. In 1907 he married Constance Schweich the only daughter and heiress of Leopold Schweich of Paris.

In 1907 he and his wife bought Grove House, a villa in Regent's Park built by Decimus Burton, at auction. He decorated the music room with scenes from Ovid's Metamorphoses and held philanthropic activities in the garden. He is said to have had a particular fondness for Regent's Park and set aside a sum of money, the Constance Fund, to enable gifts of sculpture to parks in London as a memorial to his wife in the event of her death.

In 1898 he painted a mural for the Royal Exchange, London The Crown offered to Richard III at Baynard’s Castle.

== Empire murals ==
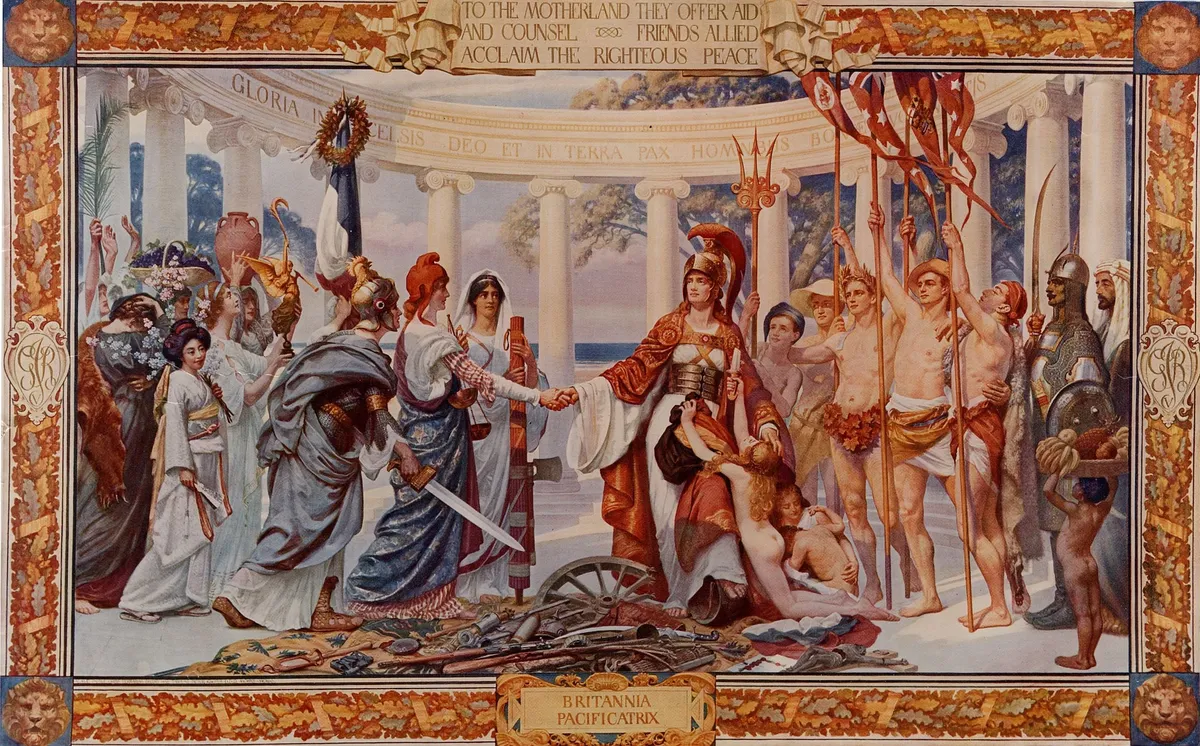
Britannia pacificatrix, one of a series of murals that hang on the first floor at the top the grand staircase in the Foreign Office. The series of murals depict the "origin, education, development, expansion and triumph of the British Empire, leading up to the Covenant of the League of Nations". It took Goetze seven years to complete the murals and he painted them at his own expense throughout the First World War. They were presented to the Foreign Office in 1921.

Between 1912 and 1921, Goetze painted a mural scheme for the Foreign Office depicting the Origin, education, development, expansion and triumph of the British Empire. Goetze had offered to create the works free of charge. They were executed in the spirit fresco technique on canvas and then attached to the walls. Goetze undertook a European tour to study frescoes in France and elsewhere in preparation. He was especially influenced by the work of Puvis de Chavannes and Frederic Leighton. The original plans were altered following the war to culminate in the international Covenant of the League of Nations, leading to the inclusion of emblematic figures of France, America and other nations.

The canvases were installed against the wishes of the Foreign Secretary, Lord Curzon, who objected to them, supposedly because of their display of naked flesh. It has been suggested that it was the political content of the images that really offended Curzon, as they ran counter to his vision of the Empire.

The antisemitic writer Harold Sherwood Spencer became obsessed with the idea that Goetze's paintings were part of a Jewish conspiracy to undermine the British Empire. In 1922 Spencer attacked Goetze in the journal Plain English, calling him "a foreign Jew" who was "an alien in Common Law and a perpetual enemy of this Christian empire". Goetze sued Spencer for libel. Spencer was convicted and sentenced to six months imprisonment.

== Philanthropy ==
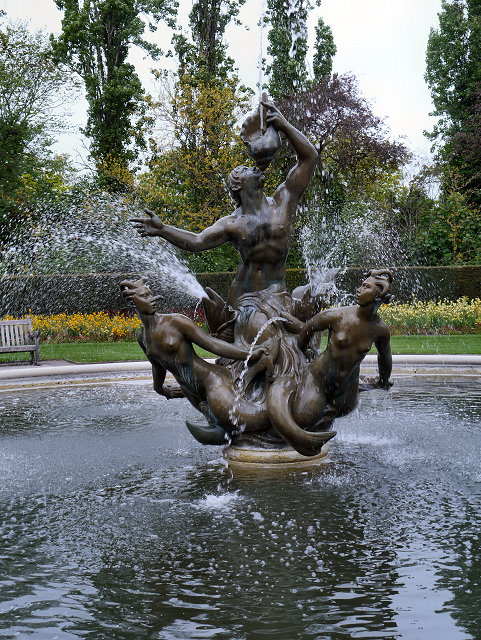
Triton and Dryads, a fountain in Regent's Park commissioned by Goetze and eventually dedicated as a memorial to him

In 1932 Goetze and Constance donated the eastern gates for the gardens of the Inner Circle of Regent's Park, in 1938 they donated the southern or jubilee gates to be installed for the re-opening of the gardens as Queen Mary's Gardens in 1939.

Following the death of his friend, sculptor Sir Alfred Gilbert, in 1934 Goetze assisted the National Art Collections Fund in acquiring Gilbert's collection and dispersing it to various public collections.

Goetze and Constance also donated two bronze sculptures by Albert Hodge, The Lost Bow (1910) and A Mighty Hunter (1913), which were probably commissioned for Grove House.

Following his death in 1939, Constance made a number of donations to various museums including: a 15th-century manuscript of Pseudo-Augustine, now in the Henry Davis Collection at the British Library and a series of religious sculptures to the Fitzwilliam Museum.

=== The Constance Fund ===
In 1944, in order to honour her husband, Constance established his Constance Fund, which she administered until her death in 1951. The fund was dedicated to "the encouragement of Ideal Sculpture and its setting for Parks and Public Places in conjunction with the settings and surroundings"; Goetze had stipulated that its Committee consist of three sculptors, an architect, a horticulturalist and "a few laymen". In 1950 the Triton and Dryads fountain, designed by William McMillan in 1936, was at last installed in Queen Mary's Gardens with an inscription commemorating Goetze as a "Painter[,] Lover of the Arts and Benefactor of this Park". In 1951 the Constance Fund commissioned the Diana in the Trees Fountain in Green Park and its final commission, in 1963, was the Joy of Life fountain in Hyde Park.

== Bibliography ==
- Ward-Jackson, Philip (2011), Public Sculpture of Historic Westminster: Volume 1, Public Sculpture of Britain, Liverpool: Liverpool University Press
