= T. B. Huxley-Jones =

British sculptor

Thomas Bayliss Huxley-Jones (14 March 1908 – 10 December 1968) was a British sculptor known for creating several public works for British towns and cities.

== Biography ==
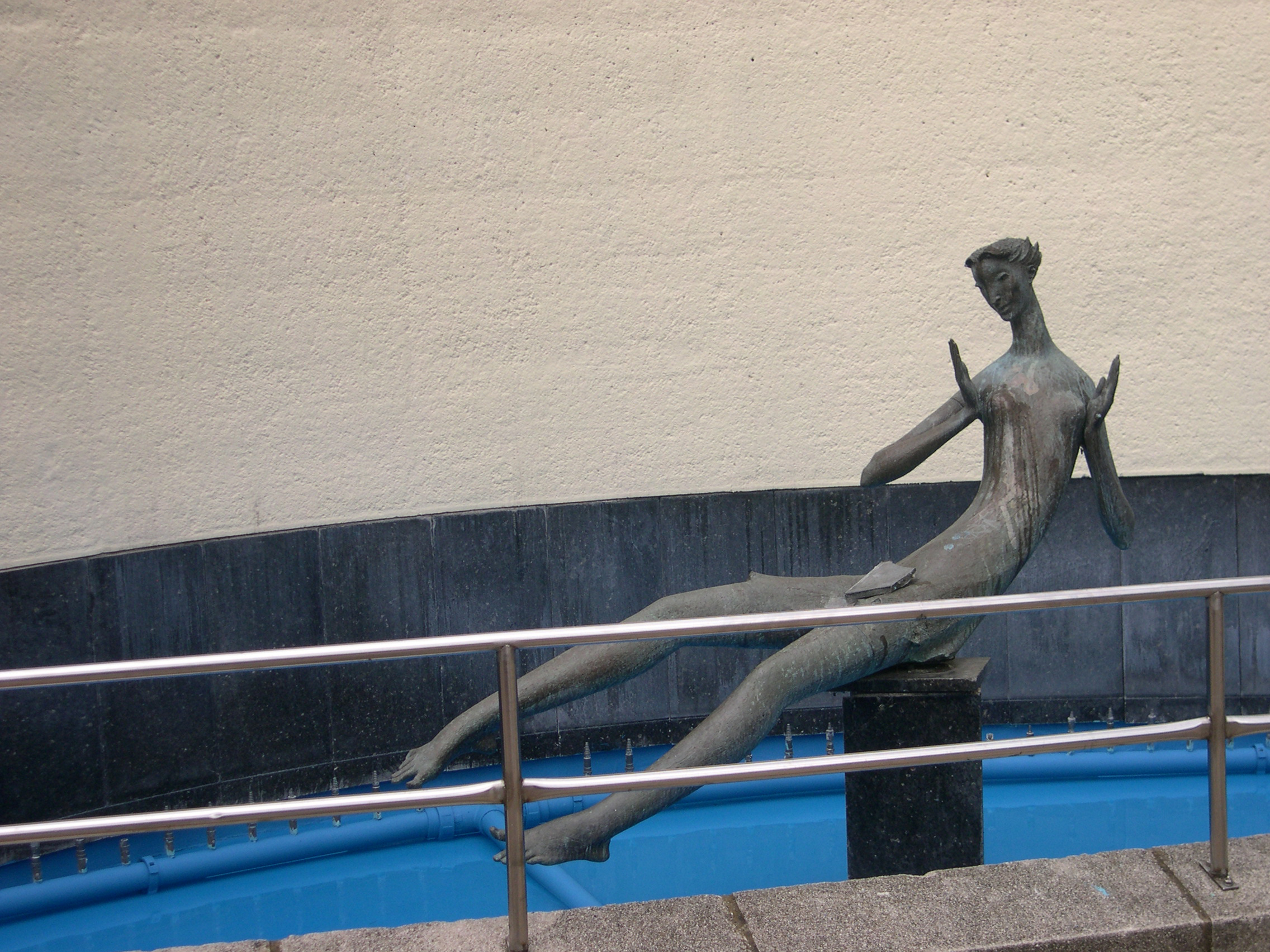
Reclining figure by Huxley-Jones outside Hornsey Library.

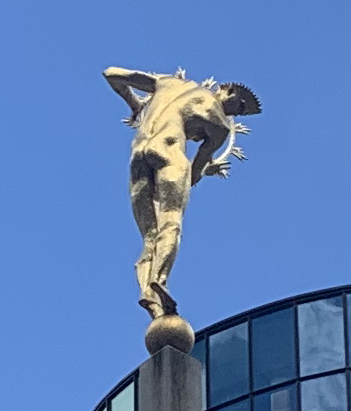
Helios Statue White City

Huxley-Jones was born at Staffordshire and studied at the Wolverhampton School of Art from 1924 to 1929 and then, until 1933, at the Royal College of Art in London where his tutors included both Gilbert Ledward and Henry Moore. After graduating, Huxley-Jones held the post of head of sculpture at Gray's School of Art in Aberdeen.

Working in bronze, ivory and terracotta, Huxley-Jones exhibited statuettes and reliefs at the Royal Academy, at the Royal Scottish Academy, at the New English Art Club, with the Society of Scottish Artists and the Royal Birmingham Society of Artists. Huxley-Jones received a large number of public commissions for his sculptures, which were often elegant compositions with a smooth surface and a simple profile.

These public works include the statue of Helios at BBC Television Centre in London and the 1963 Joy of Life Fountain in London's Hyde Park, He also created Mother and Child for Chelmsford's Central Park Memorial Gardens which won an award from the Royal Society of British Sculptors in 1966 and was renovated in 2009.

Huxley-Jones was married to the artist Gwynneth Holt and lived at Chelmsford in Essex and died at near there, at Broomfield. Aberdeen and Wolverhampton art galleries hold examples of his work. Letters to Huxley-Jones from the architect Graham Richards Dawbarn are preserved at the Essex Record Office.

== Selected publications ==
- Modelled portrait heads. Tiranti.
