= The Shepherd of the Giant Mountains =

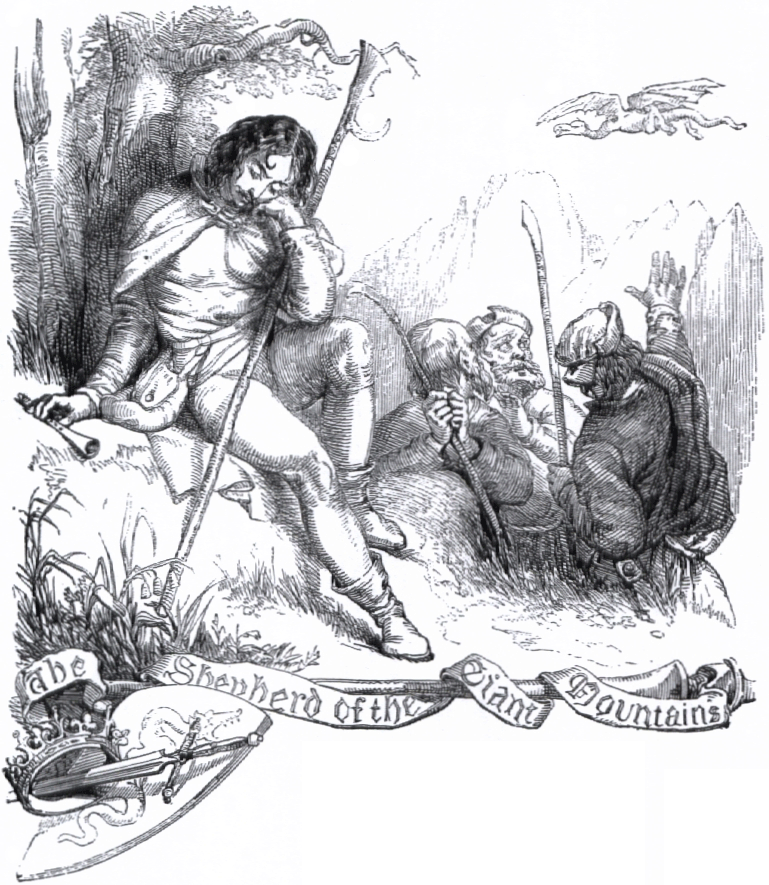
Gottschalk deep in thought with his staff and pipe, while the griffin flies in the distance and his fellow shepherds watch in horror (Illustration by Selous)

The Shepherd of the Giant Mountains (German: Der Hirt des Riesengebürgs) is a German ballad collected by Friedrich de la Motte Fouqué in 1818. It was translated into English by Menella Bute Smedley in 1846.

== Synopsis ==
The ballad tells the story of a shepherd named Gottschalk who falls in love with Adiltrude, the duke's daughter. He and his fellow shepherds are plagued by a griffin that steals their sheep and (they fear) will eventually attack them as well. Realizing that he has no hope of defeating a creature that can fly away, Gottschalk refuses to worry, instead composing songs about the duke's daughter and singing them to his dour fellow shepherd, Hans.

When, however, the duke's herald announces that whoever kills the griffin will receive the hand of Adiltrude in marriage, Gottschalk determines to kill the monster. He follows the griffin to her nest and watches her and her children make a gruesome meal of dead oxen, and leaves without being seen.

Returning with a sharpened staff, Gottschalk stops to pray for God's help before arriving at the nest while the mother griffin is away. Reminding himself that the young griffins will grow up to feed on people, Gottschalk sets fire to the nest. Hearing their cries, the mother griffin hurries back, attempting to put out the flame with her wings. She is too late; the young griffins are dead, and her wings catch fire. Turning to fight Gottschalk on the ground, the griffin nearly crushes him, but he stabs her first in the eye and then in the heart, killing her.

Gottschalk drags the carcass to the duke's castle. Sir Baldwin, who hoped to marry Adiltrude himself, objects that she be given to a peasant. However, the duke, though musing sadly, keeps his promise and offers his daughter in marriage. Adiltrude is also shy, if not hesitant, but affirms Gottschalk's bravery and asks her father's blessing on their marriage.

The duke offers Gottschalk as much land as he can circle with his flock in one day, and Gottschalk gains a whole county in this way, but Sir Baldwin mocks him for gaining land with his sheep. Gottschalk promises to respond to the insult when the time is right.

Gottschalk asks the duke to keep Adiltrude long enough for him to become a knight, so that he will be more worthy of Adiltrude. He and Adiltrude part with a single kiss. More than a year later, Gottschalk returns, trained in courtly manners and fighting, and knighted. He challenges Sir Baldwin to single combat. His fighting greatly impresses both the duke and Adiltrude, and he defeats Sir Baldwin, who apologizes and reconciles to him. The duke praises Gottschalk, who asks that his land be called "the shepherd's kingdom."

== Literary Influence ==
Roger Lancelyn Green, in the Times Literary Supplement (1 March 1957), and later in The Lewis Carroll Handbook (1962), suggests that Carroll’s "Jabberwocky" may have been inspired by this work.

== See also ==
- Giant Mountains
