= Edwina Burbury =

Irish-British writer

- Born: 1810s Galway
- Died: 17 February 1870; Wallingford
- Occupation: writer

Edwina Jane Burbury born Edwina Hicks (1810s – 17 February 1870) was an Irish born British writer.

== Life ==
Burbury was born in Galway in 1818 or 1819 to Frances (born Pickering) and Edward Raymond Hicks. Her father was a soldier and her life is not recorded until she married a solicitor named Thomas Potter Burbury on 9 August 1841. He was four or five years older than her and they had at least seven children. She appears to have turned to writing because of finances as her husband had difficulties. She had an early success with a book written for young people titled "How to Spend a Week Happily". She wrote for Sharpe's London Magazine

In 1849 Frank Smedley arranged for a book to be produced titled "Seven Tales by Seven Authors". The authors included Smedley, Burbury and her friend George Payne Rainsford James. The proceeds of the book were directed to Burbury because of her financial difficulties and she was given the copyright. The book was republished in 1860 and Smedley purchased the copyright from Burbury to allow this and Smedley explained its history in that editions introduction.

She wrote a sequel to "How to Spend a Week Happily" titled, "Mabel Trevor," which was published in the early 1850s as well as her best novel "Florence Sackville". "Florence Sackville" was admired by Charlotte Bronte. By 1855 she was still short of money and Charles Dickens gave her five pounds.

On 15 March 1868 her husband died and she inherited his debts. He had run off with her sister and she had to pay for her children and her sister. However she had been self sufficient financially since 1860. She died on 17 February 1870.
