= Diana Fountain, Green Park =

Fountain and statue by Estcourt J Clack

Coordinates: 51.50632°N 0.14226°W

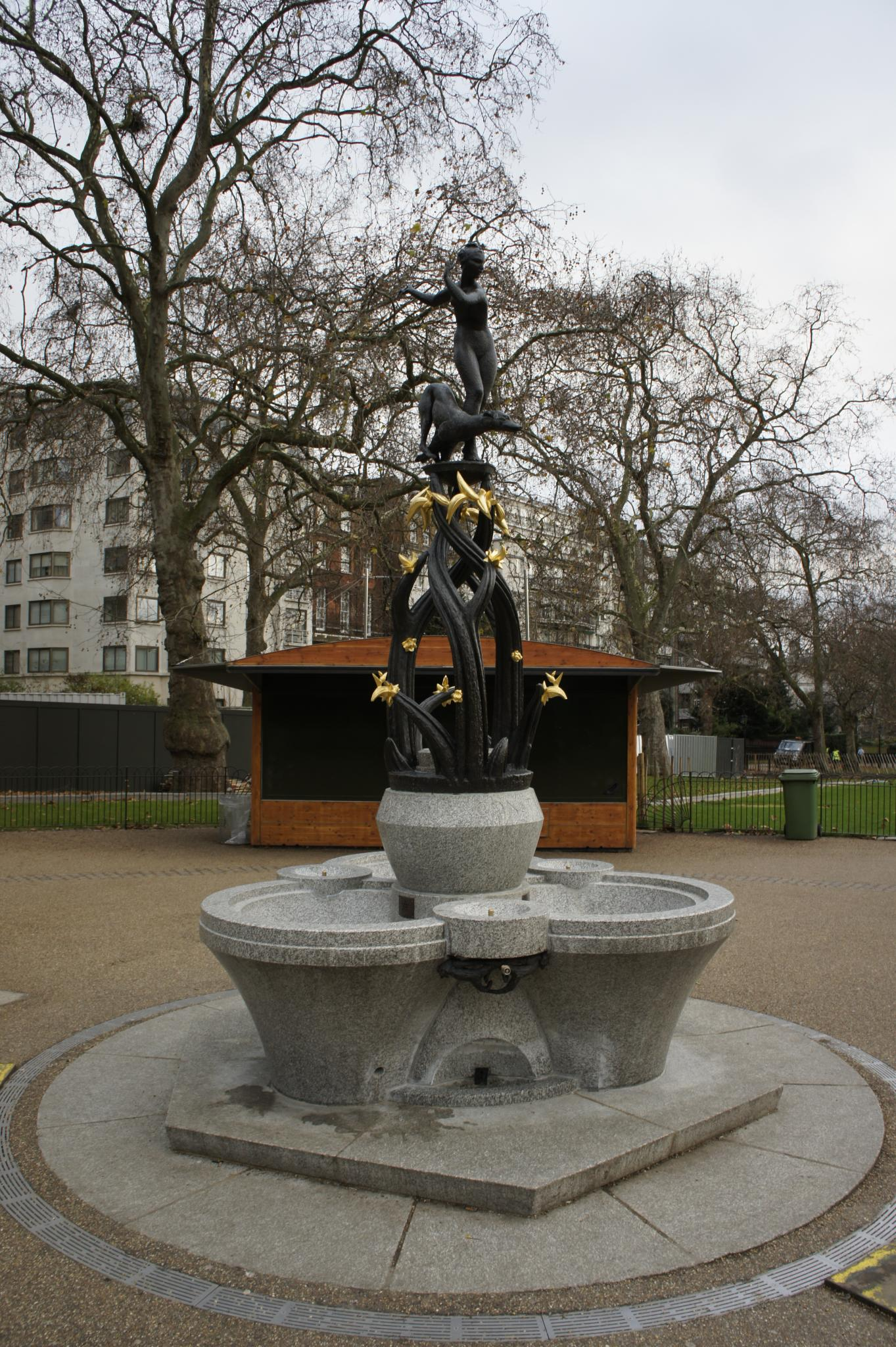
The fountain in its new location

The Diana Fountain, also known as Diana of the Treetops, is a fountain and statue of the mythological Diana with her traditional greyhound, posed on a circular platform held aloft by stylized tree branches by Estcourt J Clack that stands in Green Park. The park and statue are in the City of Westminster in central London.

The statue was a gift of the Constance Fund, which had been established by artist Sigismund Goetze to gift sculptures to London parks in memory of his wife. Sigismund pre-deceased his wife in 1939 and she administered the Constance Fund until her death in 1951, commissioning a number of sculptures in his memory.

Constance Goetze was approached by the Ministry of Works in April 1950 with a view to securing financial support from the Fund to replace a fountain in Green Park by Sydney Smirke that was deemed beyond repair. Following an exchange of letters the Fund in June 1950 the fund agreed their support and a competition was organised with Sir William Reed Dick assisting the Fund in selecting a successful winner.

Six sculptors took part in the competition: Maurice Lambert, Harold Dow, Siegfried Charoux, Geoffrey Hampton Deeley, Escourt J.Clack and Hamish Macpherson. In October 1951 it was announced that Clack, a teacher at Blundell's School in Devon, had won. The statue was presented to Sir David Eccles, the Minister of Works, by Constance's niece, Countess May Cippico, on behalf of the Fund on 30 June 1952.

From 1952 until 2011, the statue stood in the centre of the park, on the site of the earlier fountain it had replaced. In 2011, Clack's statue was removed from that site, restored with the addition of some gilding and was then placed to form the centrepiece of a new entrance that gives direct access to the park from Green Park Underground station.
