= Graham Dawbarn =

Scottish architect

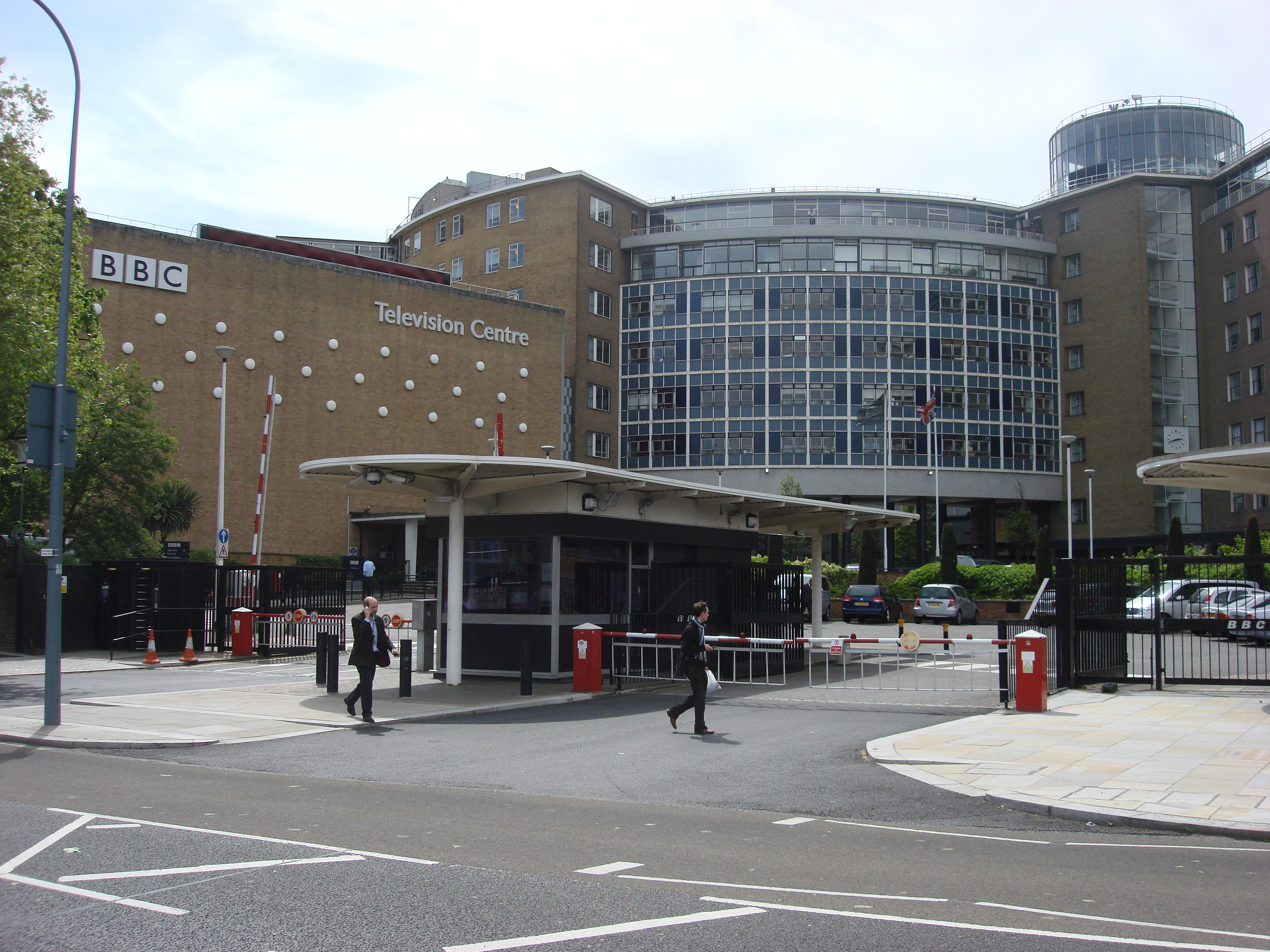
- BBC TV Centre - his most famous building
- Born: 8 September 1893; London, England
- Died: 30 January 1976 (aged 82)
- Occupation: Architect
- Years active: 1920s–1960s
- Notable work: BBC TV Centre, Imperial College

Graham Dawbarn CBE FRIBA FRAeS (8 September 1893 – 30 January 1976) was a British architect most notable for designing the Television Centre, London, the redevelopment of Imperial College and an impressive variety of British interwar airport/aerodrome buildings.

== Biography ==
Dawburn was born in London 8 September 1893, the son of R. A. Dawburn, a Civil Engineer. He was educated at The King's School, Canterbury and at Corpus Christi College, Cambridge, reading Maths Part 1 and then Architectural Studies in 1914. He served in the Royal Flying Corps and after the War he returned to Cambridge and assisted Professor E S Prior in the Architecture School. In 1920–21 he worked in the office of the architect Arthur Keen and passed the war final RIBA examination in 1921.

- 1921-1923 he worked in the Public Works Department in Hong Kong.
- 1924 won in open competition the design for Raffles College with Cyril Farey. This was the forerunner of the National University of Singapore and is now the older building of their Faculty of Law
- 1931 Flew 8,000 miles in a light aeroplane with Nigel Norman in the US studying airports
- 1931/32 Designed the Brooklands Aero Clubhouse, officially opened on 28 May 1932
- 1933 Founded Norman and Dawbarn where he remained a senior partner until 1958
- 1945-47 President of the Architectural Association and member of the RIBA Council
- 1948 awarded the CBE in the 1948 Birthday Honours List
- 1951 won 2 Architectural Awards from the Council of the Festival of Britain.
- 1956 the foundation stone for BBC Television Centre was laid
- 1960 Her Majesty the Queen formally opened Television Centre

He married Olive Topham in 1923 and they had two daughters

== Professional career ==
In partnership with Sir Nigel Norman he designed airport buildings at Heston, Birmingham, Jersey, Guernsey, Manchester and Wolverhampton. After Norman's death in a flying accident during World War II, Dawbarn continued the practice on his own. The firm, Norman and Dawbarn, was purchased by Capita in 2005

In the late 1920s and early 1930s he collaborated with Alan Muntz in an airport consultancy firm called Norman, Muntz and Dawbarn, and with Norman he made a tour of airports around the world to make recommendations to RIBA on airport design.

=== Television Centre ===
The BBC commissioned him to design its new home for television. According to Louis Barfe:

Dawbarn is reputed to have begun his design process by drawing a large question mark on the back of an envelope, indicating that he had no idea where to start. Soon, however, his "precise and mathematical mind" began to realise that the symbol of his uncertainty represented a good shape for the building, using the tapering site most efficiently, allowing the free movement of equipment, scenery and people and offering scope for further expansion as necessary.

Its not wholly clear if this is fully acuarate -

"The story of how architect Graham Dawbarn came up with the design is well documented - Given a fifty-page brief, he is said to have retreated to a pub for inspiration and with a plan of the oddly-shaped site in his head he pondered on the problem: How to fit eight to ten studios in this area – giving easy access to scenery and separately to artists, crew and audiences. Gazing at it for a few seconds he doodled a question mark on an envelope and the penny dropped. The shape was perfect."

The sketch was speculated to be made while Dawbarn was explaining ideas already in his head, rather than being the doodle that inspired them. It was a scheme that produced what is considered as the most efficiently designed studio centre in the UK and possibly the world, with no other building considered to have come close.

In 2020 Television Centre was officially 60 years old and a commemorative film was made by the Royal Television Society to celebrate, featuring Phillip Schofield (who as a child had always wanted to work in the building)

=== Imperial College ===
In 1956 Dawbarn was engaged to redevelop Imperial College, demolishing the late Victorian Imperial Institute in South Kensington. In response to public outcry in 1956 he said: "Change is usually sad, but it is dangerous to live too much in the past, and to overstate the past at the expense of the future." There was so much opposition to the original scheme that a new one was proposed in 1958 which kept the highly symbolic clock tower of the old Imperial Institute.

=== Airport buildings ===
Early in his career, after a study tour of American airports, Dawbarn designed various impressive airport/aerodrome buildings at Heston, Brooklands, Birmingham, Jersey, Guernsey, Manchester and Wolverhampton. He designed the blister hangar, a prefabricated aircraft hangar used during World War II.

=== Other buildings ===
Other notable buildings include:

- The Institute of Medical Psychology
- The Wilton Estate in Dalston
- The Froebel Educational Institute at the University of Roehampton
- Makerere University College (now Makerere University), Kampala: students' hall of residence
- Secondary School, College Road, Cheshunt, Hertfordshire
- University of Dar es Salaam
