= Gwynneth Holt =

British artist

- Born: Rose Gwynneth Cobden Holt; 1909; Wednesbury, England
- Died: 1995 (aged 85–86)
- Education: Wolverhampton College of Art
- Known for: Sculpture

Rose Gwynneth Cobden Holt (1909–1995), was a British artist known for her ivory sculptures on religious subjects. Her most famous work is a depiction of the Annunciation, created circa 1946.

== Biography ==
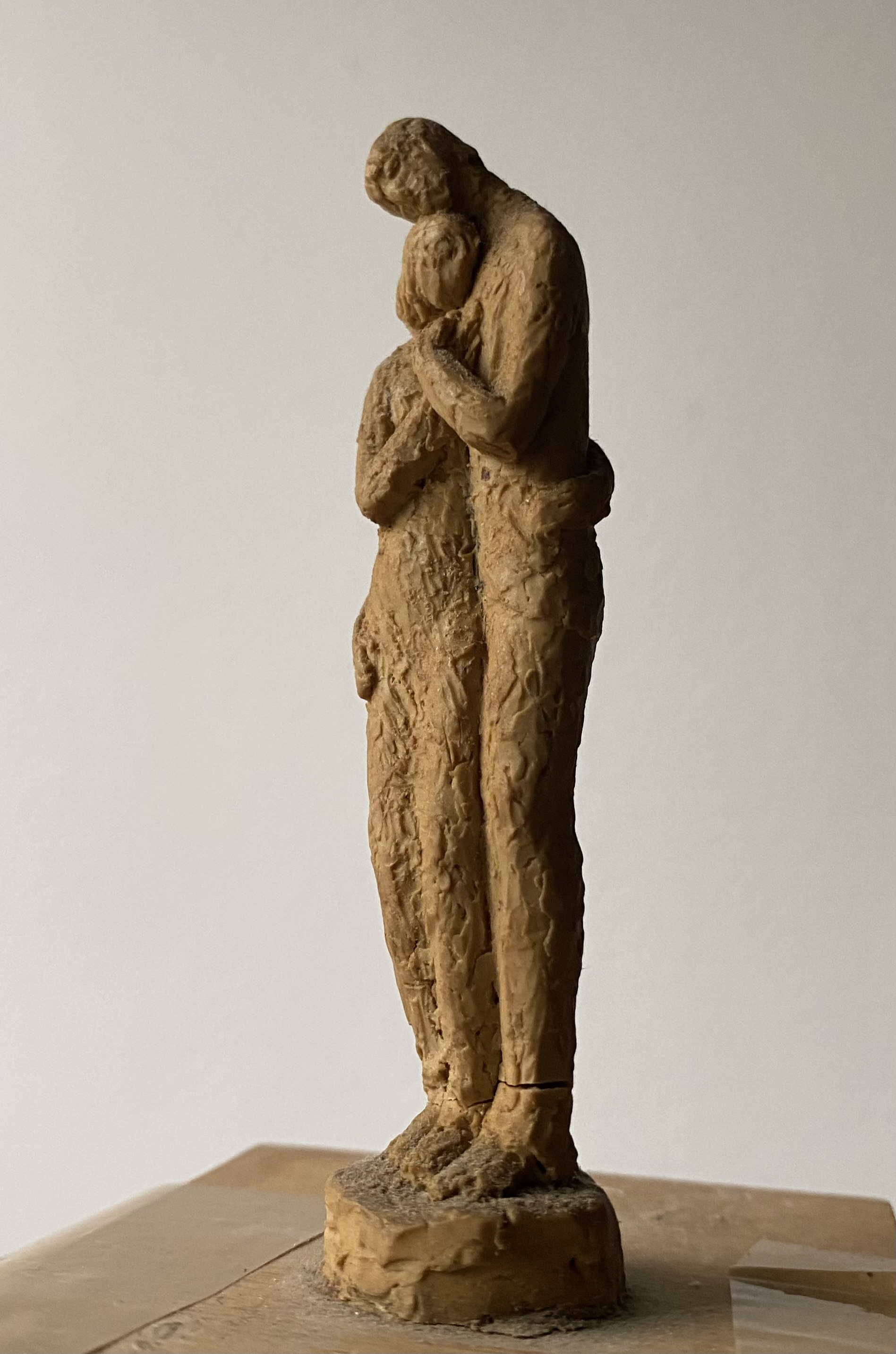
Clay maquette by Gwynneth Holt

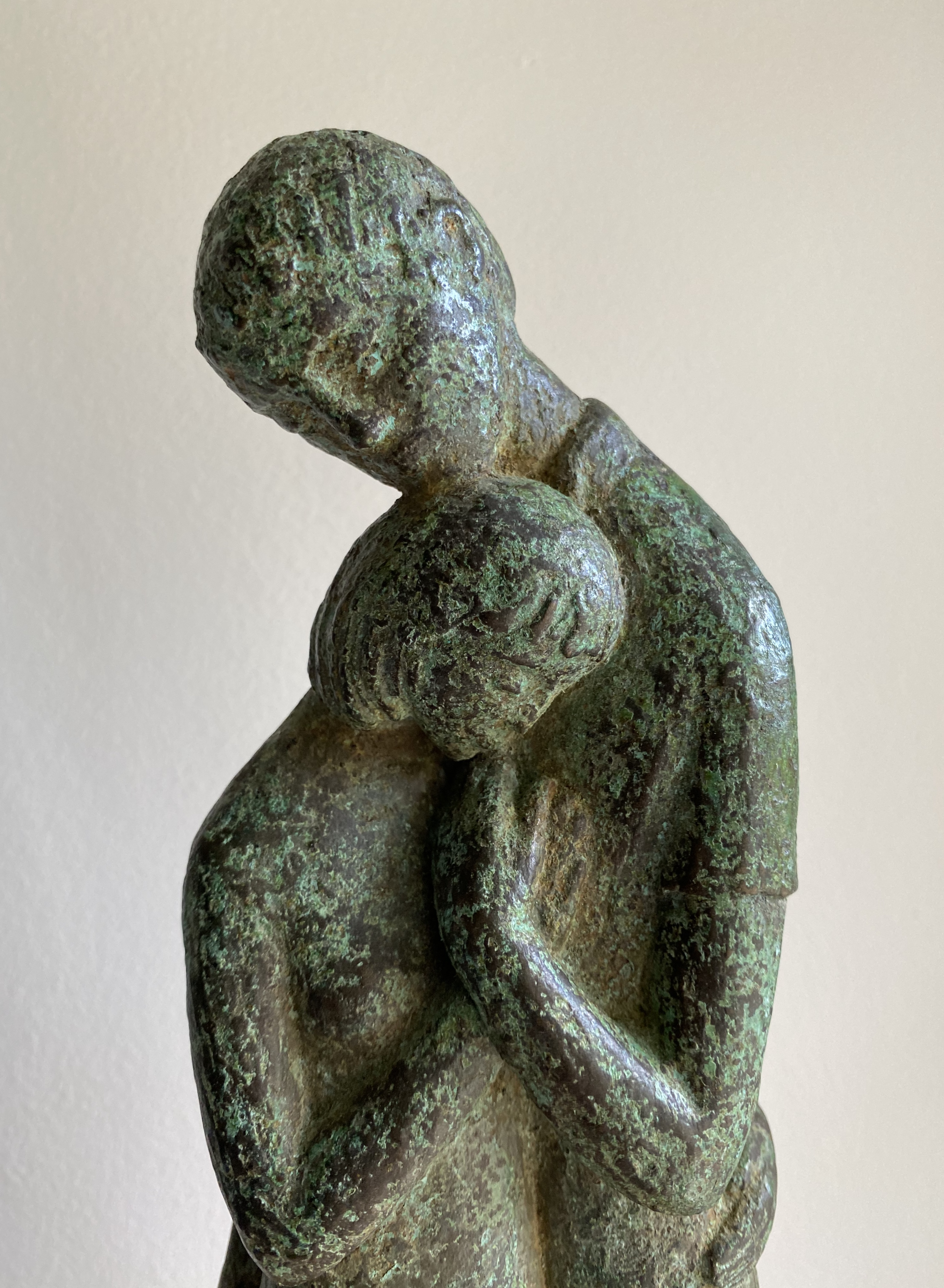
Two figures bronze by Gwynneth Holt

Holt was born in Wednesbury, Staffordshire in 1909. She was the eldest of three daughters and after attending St Anne's Convent in Birmingham, was accepted into Wolverhampton School of Art aged 16. There she studied under Richard Emerson and met a fellow student, T. B. Huxley-Jones, whom she married in 1934. They were both awarded places at the Royal College of Art but Holt did not take her place due to the financial burden on her family.

Huxley-Jones studied under Richard Garbe, an eminent sculptor in ivory and tortoiseshell, materials not commonly used by sculptors at the time. He would influence the direction of both their work. In 1934, Huxley-Jones was appointed Head of Sculpture at Gray's School of Art in Aberdeen, where the couple were based for twelve years. It was during this time that Holt created Annunciation.

Holt went on to produce numerous ecclesiastical commissions and exhibited widely, including at the Royal Society of British Sculptors, the Society of Portrait Sculptors, the Royal Academy, the Royal Scottish Academy and the Royal Glasgow Institute of the Fine Arts. She was also among the first female members of the Royal Society of Sculptors. However, she expressed with frustration, her feelings on the male-dominated nature of the profession.

"Women are just as intelligent as men, and their contribution to art is just as valuable: They are not given a chance to take art up seriously. What with looking after the house, there is not much time left for concentrating on art."

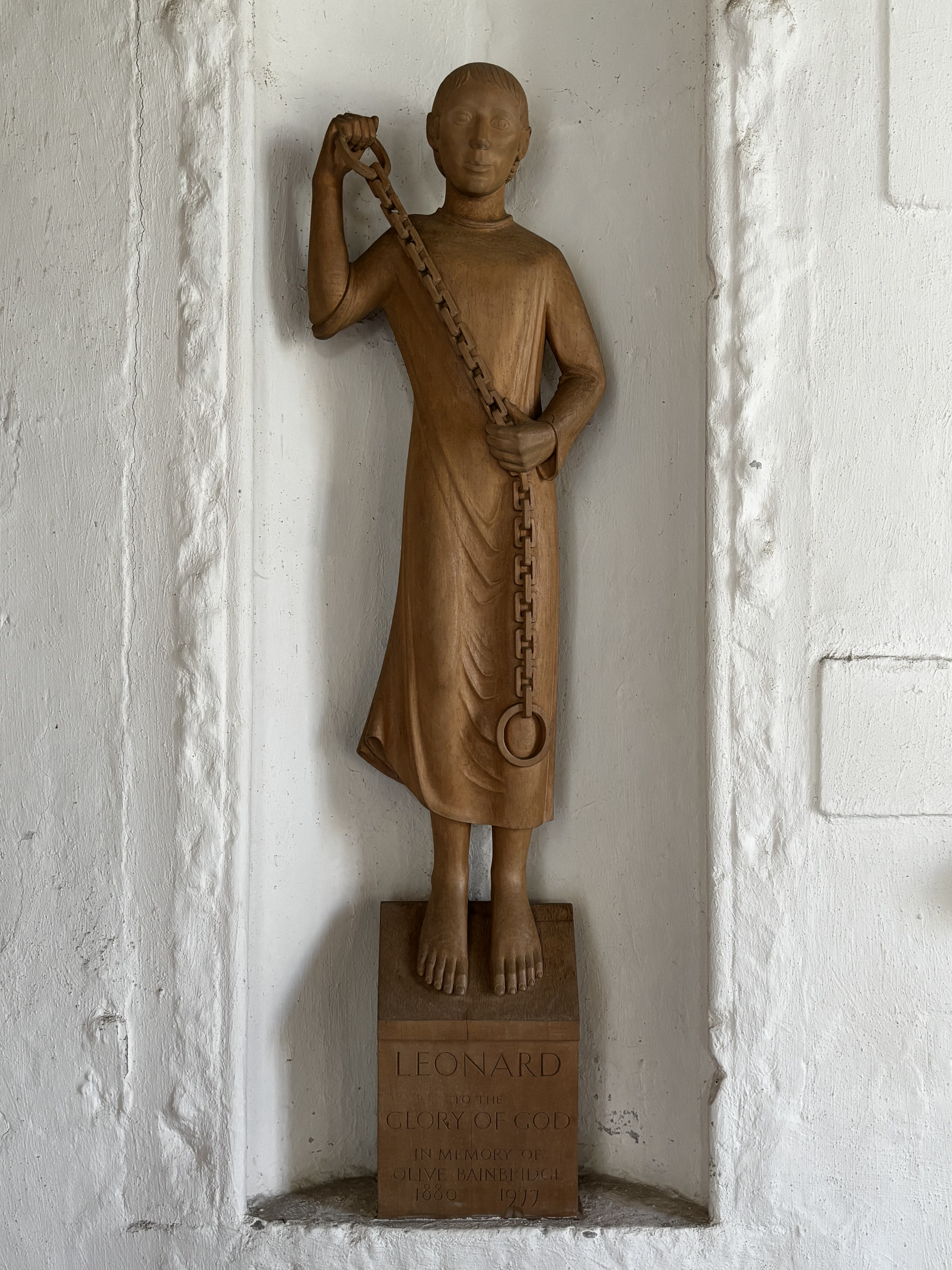
Sculpture of St. Leonard

== Works held in public collections ==
Title	Year	Medium	Gallery no.	Gallery	Location
Bishop Gordon	1966–1974	bronze	1993-0341	Manx National Heritage	Isle of Man
Girl Holding a Book	–	terracotta	1995.1004	Chelmsford Museum	Essex, England
Hall Caine	mid-20th C	ceramic	1993-0342	Manx National Heritage	Isle of Man
Head of a Girl	–	plaster	1995.377	Chelmsford Museum	Essex, England
Reverend John Finlay Rutherford	1950s	bronze	TUF1	Chelmsford Museum	Essex, England

== Works held in private collections ==
Title	Year	Medium	Collection	Location
Two figures	-	bronze	Collection of C P Ridley RIBA	United Kingdom
Two figures	-	clay maquette	Collection of C P Ridley RIBA	Hong Kong
