= Frank Smedley =

Francis Edward Smedley (4 October 1818 – 1 May 1864) was an English novelist. His name appears in print usually as Frank E. Smedley.

== Life ==
He was born with deformed feet, a disability that impaired his mobility and prevented him from attending regular school. Instead he was privately educated by his uncle. (Note: The Reverend Edward Smedley, an usher at Westminster. He was the father of Menella Smedley. The family were cousins of the Dodsons.) His cousin, the poet Menella Bute Smedley, later kept house for him and acted as his secretary. Smedley died in London in 1864 and is buried in Marlow Parish Churchyard, Buckinghamshire.

== Works ==
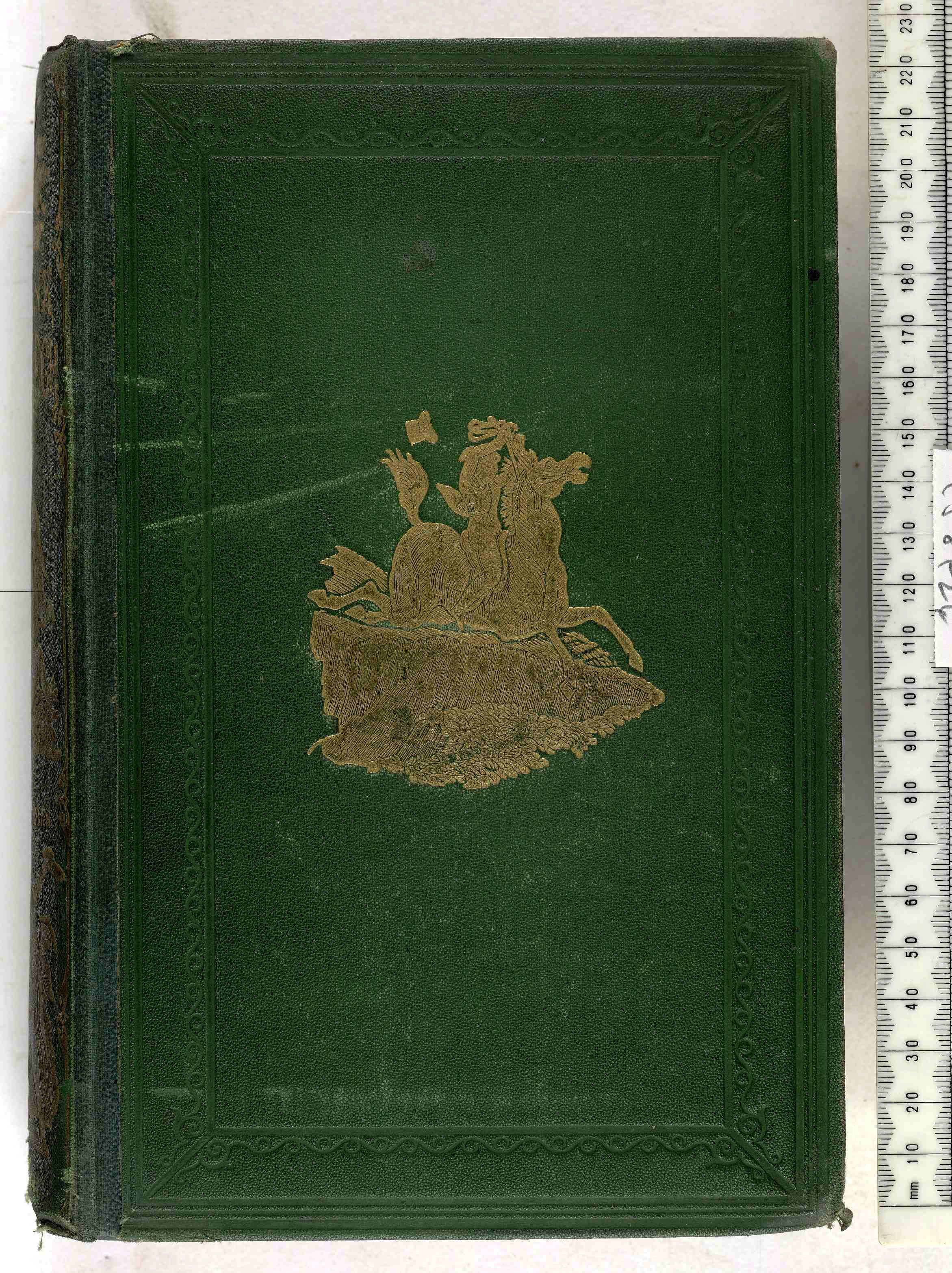
Book cover of Frank Fairlegh or Scenes from the Life of a Private Pupil, with illustrations by George Cruikshank

Smedley contributed his first book, Scenes from the Life of a Private Pupil, anonymously to Sharpe's London Magazine in 1846–1848. Smedley is credited with being the editor of that magazine. In 1849 he arranged for a book to be produced titled "Seven Tales by Seven Authors". The authors included Edwina Burbury and George Payne Rainsford James. The proceeds of the book were directed to Burbury who had "financial difficulties" and she was given the copyright. The book was republished in 1860 and Smedley purchased the copyright from Burbury to allow this and recording its history in that edition's introduction.

Smedley's first essay proved so successful that it was expanded into Frank Fairlegh, and published in book form in 1850. His next book, Lewis Arundel or The Railroad of Life, was originally contributed to the same magazine, which he for some time edited, and was published in book form in 1852. Of his other writings the best known is Harry Coverdale's Courtship (1855). These stories are racily told. Either Hablot Knight Browne ("Phiz") or George Cruikshank supplied illustrations for most of his books.
