= Television Centre, London =

Mixed-use complex in West London

Television Centre
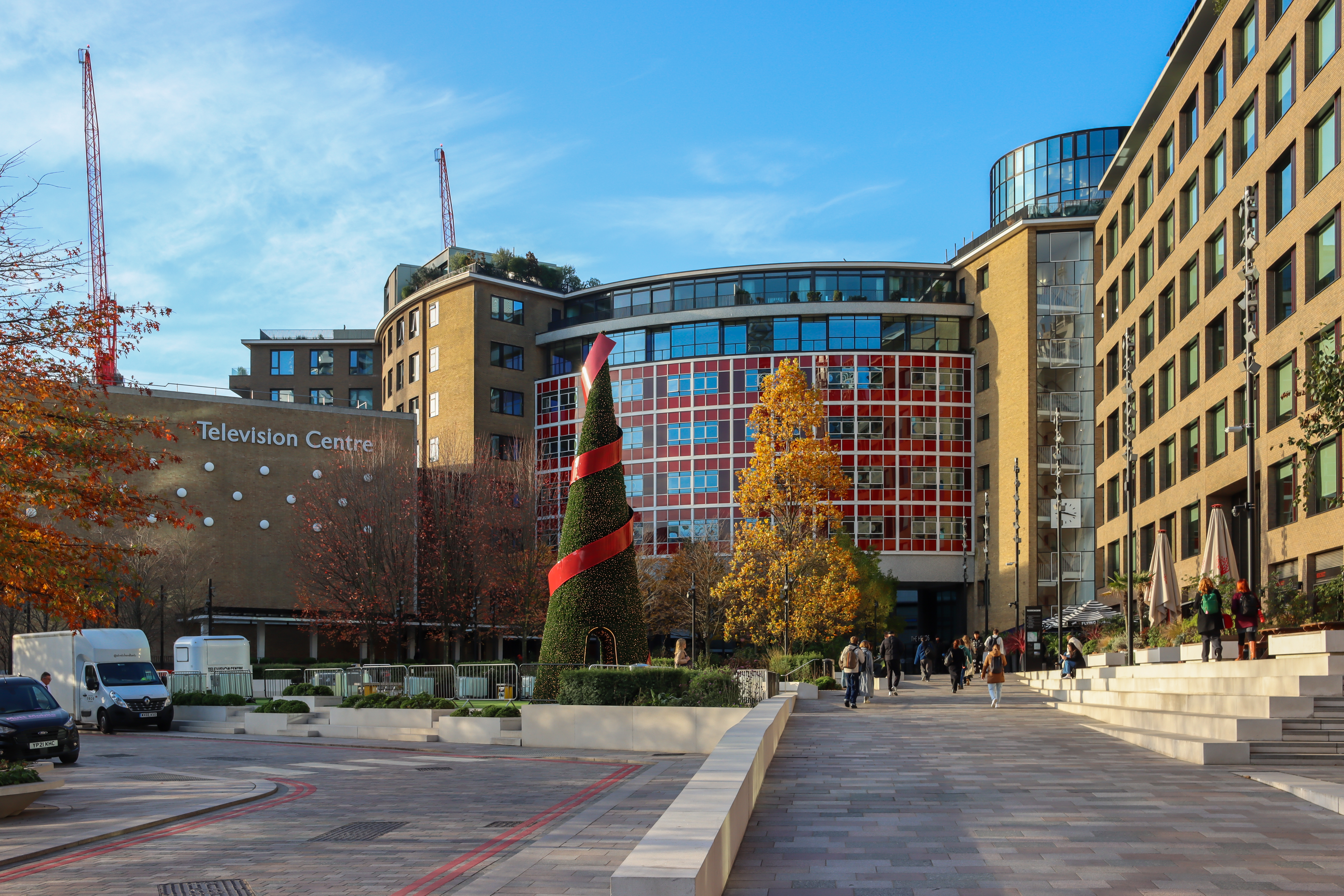
- Television Centre in 2024

- Location within Greater London Location within London Borough of Hammersmith and Fulham
- Former names: BBC Television Centre
- Alternative names: BBC Studioworks' Television Centre

General information
- Type: Television production (1960–2013, 2017–present), mixed commercial and residential usage (2012–present)
- Architectural style: Minimalist
- Location: West side of Wood Lane (A219) in White City, opposite Wood Lane tube station, White City, W12 7RJ, England
- Coordinates: 51.5099°N 0.2263°W
- Elevation: 6 m (20 ft)
- Current tenants: BBC Studios; BBC Studioworks
- Completed: 29 June 1960
- Inaugurated: 29 June 1960
- Renovated: 2013–18
- Cost: £10 million adjusted by inflation: £109 million
- Owner: BBC (1949–2013); AIMCo (2013–present)

Technical details
- Floor count: 8 (above ground)
- Floor area: 14 acres (56,656 m^{2})

Design and construction
- Architect: Graham Dawbarn AHMM
- Architecture firm: Norman & Dawbarn
- Structural engineer: Marmaduke T. Tudsbery
- Main contractor: Higgs and Hill (superstructure), George Wimpey (foundations)

Website
- televisioncentre.com

Television Centre (TVC), also known as BBC Studioworks' Television Centre, is a building complex in White City, West London, which was the headquarters of BBC Television from 1960 to 2013, when BBC Television moved to Broadcasting House. The first BBC staff moved into the Scenery Block in 1953, and the centre was officially opened on 29 June 1960. It is one of the most readily recognisable facilities of its type, having appeared as the backdrop for many BBC programmes. Parts of the building are Grade II listed, including the central ring and Studio 1. Following a refurbishment, the complex reopened in 2017, providing a mix of residential apartments, retail outlets, office space, and three studios operated by BBC Studioworks for TV production.

Most of the BBC's national television and radio news output came from Television Centre, and in later years most recorded television was output from the nearby Broadcast Centre at 201 Wood Lane, care of Red Bee Media. Live television events from studios and routing of national and international sporting events took place within Television Centre before being passed to the Broadcast Centre for transmission.

The building is 4 miles (6 kilometres) west of central London, in the London Borough of Hammersmith and Fulham. The nearest Underground stations are White City on the Central Line and Wood Lane on the Circle and Hammersmith & City Lines.

== History ==
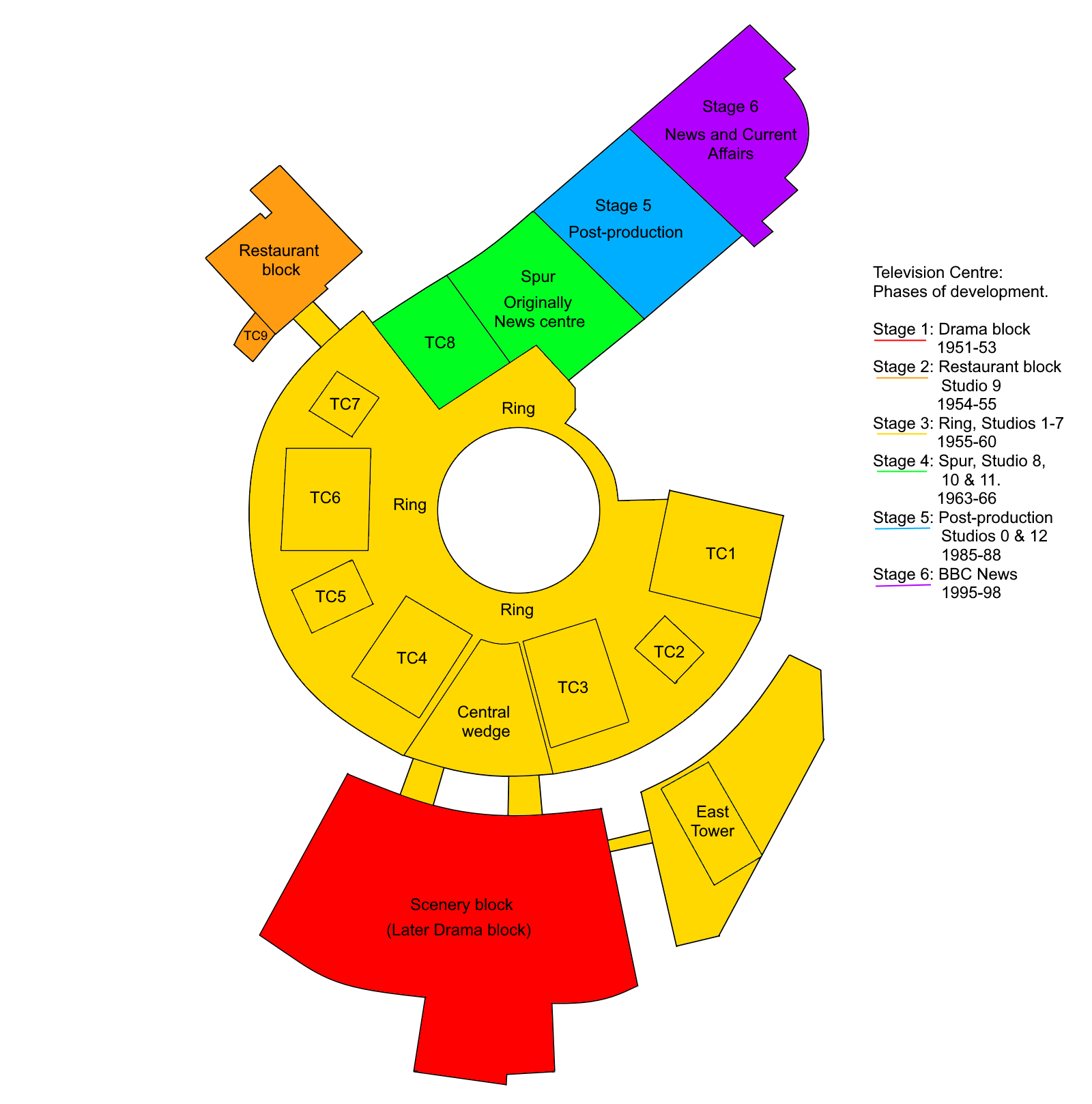
An outline plan of BBC Television Centre showing the stages of construction.

On Friday 1 April 1949, Norman Collins, the Controller of the BBC Television Service, announced at the Television Society's annual dinner at The Waldorf Hilton, London that a new TV centre would be built in Shepherd's Bush. London broadcasts at the time came from Alexandra Palace and Lime Grove Studios (from 1949). It was to be the largest television centre in the world.

It was planned to be 6 acres (2.4 hectares), but turned out to be twice the size. The building was commissioned in 1949 with work starting in 1950. However government restrictions on building, through its loan sanction and licensing of materials, ensured that building work was halted until 1953. Intended as stopgaps, the BBC remodelled the former Gaumont Studios at Lime Grove, the Riverside Studios in Hammersmith and the Shepherd's Bush Empire for television production spaces and studio use; many of these facilities were still being used by the corporation decades later.

Work resumed in 1953 on the TVC scenery block (Stage 1) and work began in 1954 on the canteen block (Stage 2), which doubled as a rehearsal space. Work on Stage 3, the central circular office block and studios, began in March 1955 on studios TC4, 5 and 2. The shells of studios TC1, TC6 and TC7 were constructed around the same time but they were not fitted out until a few years later. BBC Television Centre officially opened with TC3 operational on 29 June 1960. When it opened in June 1960, the Director of BBC television was Gerald Beadle, and the first programme broadcast was First Night with David Nixon in Studio Three.

In 1997, the BBC News Centre was opened, in a new complex at the front of the building. The decision to move radio news to this building was attributed to Director General John Birt, a move that was resisted by the managing director of BBC Radio, Liz Forgan, who resigned after failing to dissuade the governors. Birt's decision caused problems; for example some politicians accustomed to travelling to interviews at Broadcasting House in Central London were reluctant to make the journey to White City, despite being only 4 1/2 mi (7.2 km) west.

=== Redevelopment ===
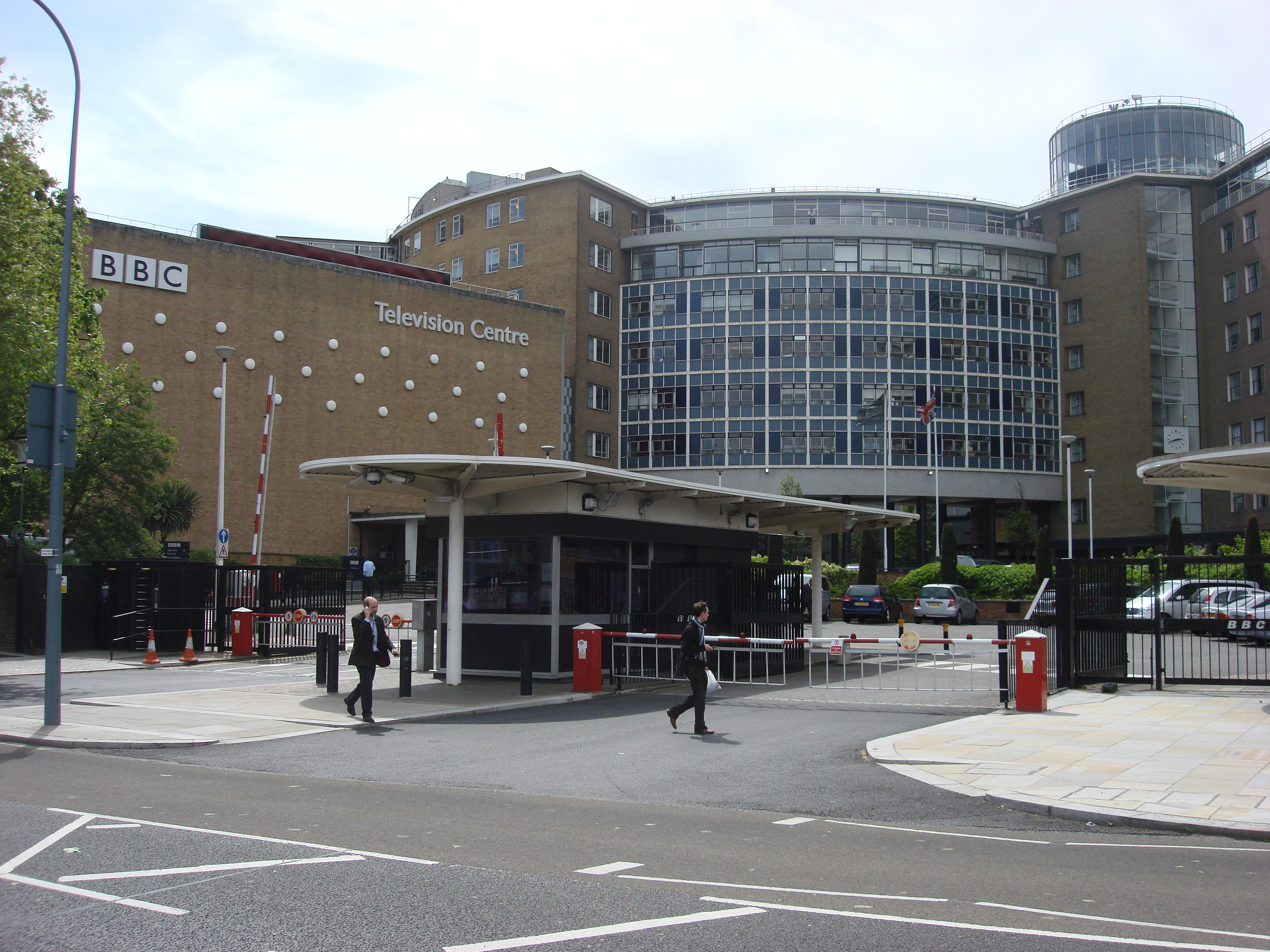
Television Centre when the BBC owned it, pictured in 2009

It was announced on 18 October 2007 that in order to meet a £2 billion shortfall in funding, the BBC intended to "reduce the size of the property portfolio in west London by selling BBC Television Centre by the end of the financial year 2012/13", with the then Director General, Mark Thompson, saying the plan would deliver "a smaller, but fitter, BBC" in the digital age. A BBC spokesman has added that "this is a full scale disposal of BBC Television Centre and we won't be leasing it back". The corporation officially put Television Centre on the property market in June 2011.

BBC Sport and BBC Children's moved to dock10, MediaCityUK in Salford Quays in 2012, with Children's Learning, BBC Radio 5 Live and part of BBC Future Media & Technology. The move saw up to 1,500 posts at TV Centre and 700 posts at New Broadcasting House relocate to Salford Quays. BBC Breakfast, part of BBC News, moved to Salford in April 2012.

On 16 July 2012, the BBC agreed to sell the site to Stanhope for £200 million. The building closed on 31 March 2013 and was redeveloped to include flats, office space, a cinema and hotels. Studios 1, 2 and 3 along with part of the basement and offices have been refurbished and leased back to the BBC on a 15-year lease. The original schedule would have seen Studios 1, 2, & 3 back in production by Autumn of 2014 however on 17 July 2014 the BBC announced that due to the extensive building work, programme production would not recommence at Television Centre until 2017 when much of the demolition and groundwork has been completed. The BBC's commercial business, BBC Studios, will lease back Stage 6 as office space which is the part formerly occupied by BBC News.

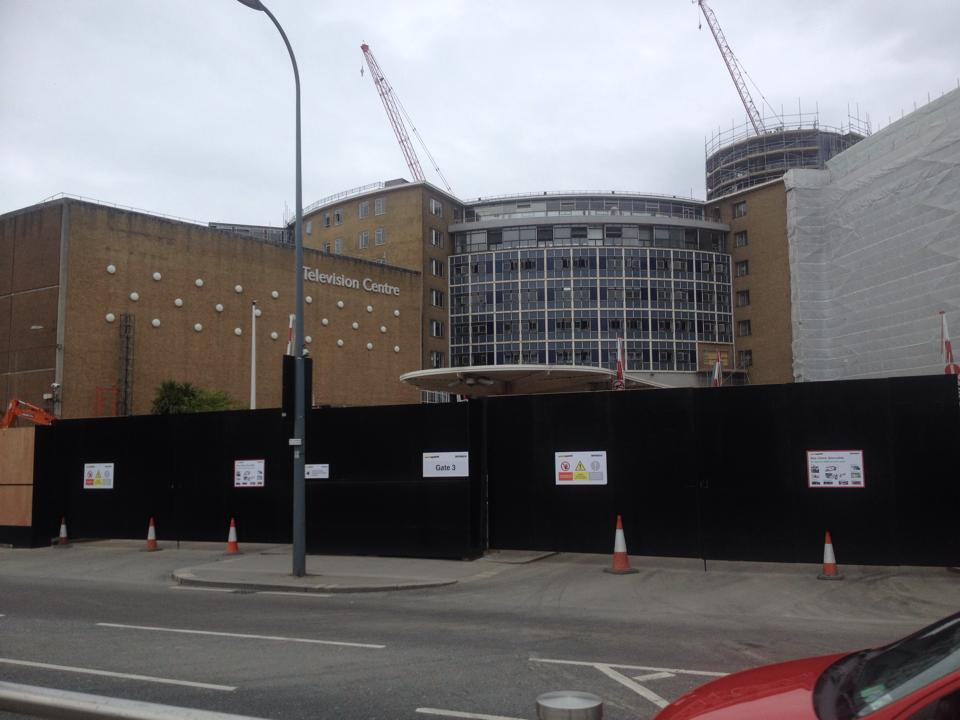
Television Centre during redevelopment in May 2015. The BBC blocks on the wall of Studio 1 were removed in September 2014.

All BBC News, national radio and BBC World Service broadcasts were relocated to Broadcasting House between July 2012 and March 2013, which is said to include one of the largest live newsrooms in the world. The final news broadcasts from Television Centre took place on 18 March 2013, when the BBC News channel and remaining news output completed the move to Broadcasting House. This was one of the final live broadcasts from the building.

A 90-minute documentary titled Tales of Television Centre was broadcast on BBC Four in 2012 ahead of the move out. On 22 March 2013, BBC Four devoted its evening schedule to programmes commemorating Television Centre. At the heart of the evening was Goodbye Television Centre, a two-hour history presented by former BBC1 controller and BBC chairman Michael Grade. The last live programme broadcast was Madness Live: Goodbye Television Centre, shown that day on BBC Four.

In March 2013, the BBC and Stanhope formed a joint venture, Television Centre Developments, to manage the redevelopment of the 14-acre site. Only three of the eight production studios were earmarked for continued use by the BBC, with the rest being demolished for flats, and it was argued that this would leave insufficient facilities in the capital for independent television production, and a Save Television Centre Studios website and petition was set up.

In December 2013, Stanhope was granted planning permission from the London Borough of Hammersmith & Fulham.

In October 2014, UK magazine Private Eye reported that having spent £60 million to remove broadcasting equipment from the building, the BBC planned to spend £12 million a year to lease back parts of the building. This decision was in direct contradiction of the BBC's promise in 2007 that the sale of TVC was a "full-scale disposal" and that it would not be leasing back any part of the building.

Demolition work began in February 2015.

As of April 2016, only Studios TC1, TC2 and TC3 remained – the other studios TC4, TC5, TC6, TC7 and TC8 had all been demolished. The statue of Helios, the Greek God of Sun, had been removed for renovation before it returned later in 2016; developer Stanhope and construction manager Mace had carefully removed the gilded bronze figure with heritage experts PAYE Conservation for repair and renovation. The Helios has stood in the rotunda at Television Centre since the former BBC headquarters opened in 1960.

=== Reopening ===
BBC Studioworks, the commercial subsidiary of the BBC operate and maintain Studios 1, 2 and 3 and the production facilities at Television Centre. The newly refurbished facilities officially opened on 1 September 2017. As of April 2017, bookings for the renovated studios were being taken.

The first programme to transmit live from the newly refurbished studios was Strictly Come Dancing: It Takes Two on BBC Two on Monday 25 September 2017. It was hosted by Zoe Ball.

In April 2018, ITV's daytime programmes Good Morning Britain, Lorraine, This Morning, Loose Women and political discussion programme Peston moved to Television Centre, due to the closure and redevelopment of The London Studios. However, in October 2018, it was announced that ITV would not be returning to the South Bank.

On 29 June 2020, Television Centre turned 60 years old and the Royal Television Society released a commemorative programme to celebrate.

On 20 May 2025, it was announced that all four ITV Studios Daytime shows would leave Television Centre as part of a schedule change that would take effect in January 2026, with Good Morning Britain moving to the headquarters of ITN, and the other three (Lorraine, This Morning and Loose Women) also leaving. Although confirmed, Peston would also be leaving Television Centre and moving to The Hospital Club in Covent Garden starting on 22 April 2026. It was later announced that Lorraine, This Morning, Loose Women and Peston would all move to The Hospital Club. This means Studio TC2 and TC3 will now be available to other television productions, especially Studio TC3 which had been block booked for Good Morning Britain and This Morning, who had permanent sets built into the studio. From January 2026, Studios TC2 and TC3 will be available for the first time since 2018 to other television programmes.

== The building ==
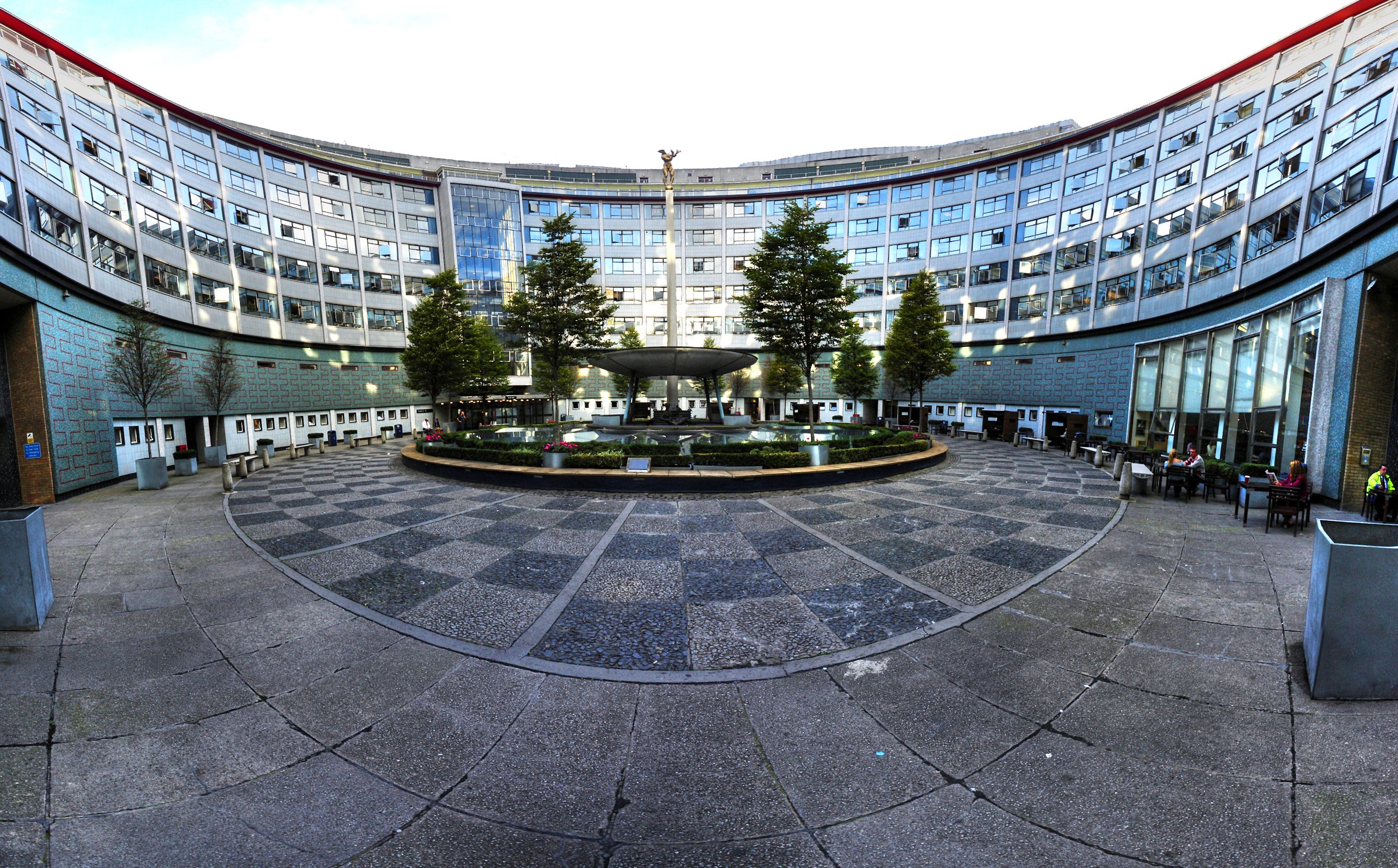
Panoramic view of the central courtyard

=== Design ===
The overall design from the air appears to resemble a question mark in shape. The architect, Graham Dawbarn, (Norman & Dawbarn), drew a question mark on an envelope (now held by the BBC Written Archives Centre) while thinking about the design of the building, and realised that it would be an ideal shape for the site. An article in The BBC Quarterly, July 1946, proposed a circular design, several years before Dawbarn drew up his plans. The building features a central circular ring (officially known as the Main Block, but often referred to by BBC staff as the "doughnut"), which comprises a central courtyard around which were studios, offices, engineering areas and the News Centre.

The building as opened in 1960 was extended a number of times, notably along the 'spur' towards Wood Lane in line with the original masterplan although the actual implementation was completed over a number of decades and by different architects. Despite a number of extensions, the BBC had to seek accommodation elsewhere, such as the nearby BBC White City complex comprising White City One, a 25,000 square metre office building, and the adjacent Broadcast and Media Centres.

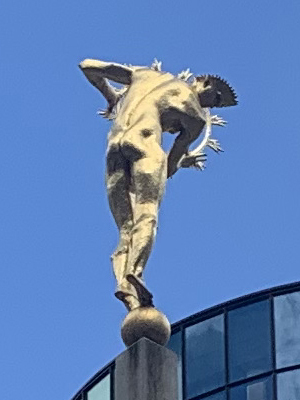
Helios statue in the central courtyard

=== Helios statue ===
In the central courtyard of the doughnut, raised on a central column, is a gilded statue designed by T. B. Huxley-Jones of Helios, the Greek god of the sun, symbolising the radiation of the light of television around the world. At the foot of the statue are two reclining figures, symbolising sound and vision, the components of television. It was originally a fountain, but owing to the building's unique shape it was too noisy for the staff in the overlooking offices, and there were problems with water leakage into the videotape area which for a long time was directly beneath.

=== Atomic Dots ===
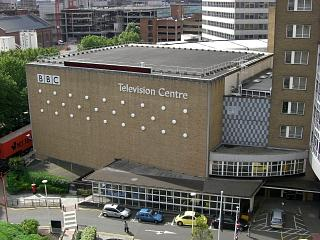
Studio 1 in 2007, showing the Atomic Dots to the facade

Affectionately known as the Atomic Dots, the 26 white circular disks attached to the exterior façade of Studio 1 are among the building's most recognisable architectural details, becoming a defining visual element of the BBC and appearing on countless television broadcasts. They form a geometric grid of three rows, which run the span of the large and otherwise unadorned rectangular red brick facade. Conceived as a functional as well as an aesthetic feature, each disk is backlit and clearly illuminated at night. Their colloquial nickname arose due to the mid-century modern design cues that are evocative of the atomic age. Designer Arthur Hayes developed the pattern by experimenting with a scale foam model, using drawing pins to explore their placement. Hayes also designed the original lettering positioned above the facade, a typography that was then incorporated across the complex.

=== John Piper mosaic ===
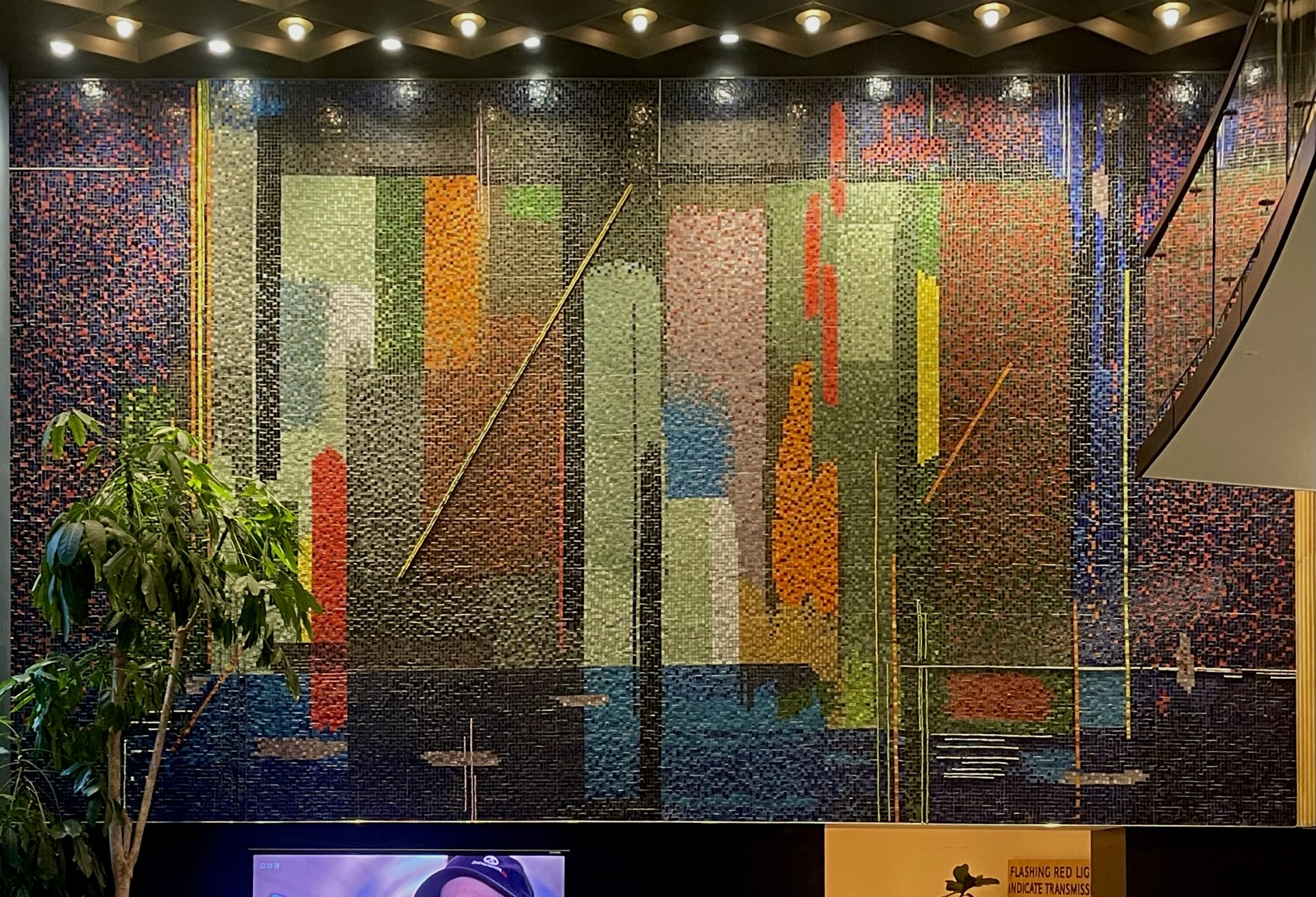
John Piper's mosaic for the entrance lobby

In the main entrance lobby is a large mosaic mural designed by John Piper that was installed ahead of the opening of the building in 1960. Piper worked with Dennis M. Williams on its manufacture and installation. Measuring 7.6 metres by 4.2 metres, it extends over the full width of the west wall. Thousands of glost-fired ceramic tesserae combine to create a multicoloured abstract design that mirrors the mid-century modern design aesthetic seen elsewhere around the building.

=== Listed status ===
The development of the Westfield shopping centre nearby led to a sharp rise in property prices and placed the Television Centre under threat. In February 2008, with an amendment in November, English Heritage requested listed status for the scenery workshop, the canteen block adjoining the Blue Peter Garden, and the central building. Previously, under a longstanding deal between the BBC and English Heritage the building was not listed to allow the BBC to make changes necessary in a broadcasting centre. In return, the BBC agreed that if it left, the fabric of the building would be restored to its mid-1960s state, and English Heritage would list notable features.

On 17 June 2009 the Central Ring of the building and Studio 1, noting in particular the John Piper mosaic, central drum with its mosaic tiles, the Huxley-Jones gilded statue of Helios, full-height glazing of the stair and original clock in the Central Ring, received Grade II listed status from the Department for Culture, Media and Sport. The 'atomic dots' and name of Studio 1, and the cantilevered porch on its exterior were noted as important architectural features of that building. The department did not consider the other buildings, including all other studios, scenery block and canteen of sufficient special interest to warrant listing. Making the protection announcement, the architecture minister Barbara Follett noted that it was where Doctor Who, Fawlty Towers and Blue Peter were made: "It has been a torture chamber for politicians, and an endless source of first-class entertainment for the nation—sometimes both at the same time."

=== Current studios ===
Currently, and in the later years of the BBC's occupation of the centre, the studio facilities were run by the wholly owned commercial subsidiary BBC Studioworks. The studios vary in size and all studios were usually abbreviated to initials, such as TC1 (Television Centre 1) for Studio 1.

The studios have hosted a wide variety of television programmes covering a diverse range of genres for a range of broadcasters. Notable productions hosted at the centre prior to 2013 include Strictly Come Dancing, Harry Hill's TV Burp, Match of the Day, Later... with Jools Holland, Miranda, The Alan Titchmarsh Show, The Armstrong & Miller Show, 8 Out of 10 Cats as well as big complex live productions such as Children in Need and Comic Relief. Classic BBC productions hosted at the site include some of Britain's best known television programmes including Fawlty Towers, Monty Python's Flying Circus, Blue Peter, Absolutely Fabulous, the original Doctor Who series and most of the best known BBC drama series.

From the 1980s the use of the complex for such productions declined with the last major drama series to be shot there being The House of Eliott, which ended in 1994, and the last single drama recorded was Henry IV, Part 1, in 1995. The reason for the decline was because drama productions (except for soap operas) shifted almost entirely onto film or single-camera video, and Television Centre was a video-based, multi-camera production environment.

- Studio 1 – 10,250 sq ft (952 m^{2}) – Opened on 15 April 1964, it was the fourth-largest television studio in Britain, and was one of the four studios to be equipped for HDTV production (along with TC4, TC6 and TC8). In May 2020, Loose Women temporarily moved from TC2 into TC1 to allow for social distancing during the COVID-19 pandemic in London. In mid-July, Loose Women returned to TC2.

Programmes recorded or transmitted included:

- Sounds Like Friday Night
- The Graham Norton Show
- Ant & Dec's Saturday Night Takeaway
- The Jonathan Ross Show
- The Russell Howard Hour
- Blind Date
- BBC Radio 1's Teen Awards
- The Last Leg
- Saturday Night Live UK
- Studio 2 – 2,400 sq ft (220 m^{2}) Opened in late 1960, the studio was home to many comedy programmes, among those being That Was the Week That Was. Initially, it was not converted for colour production, and closed in 1969, with the studio space being used for storage until it reopened in 1981. It was used by BBC News until they moved in 1997, and has played host to the Sports and Children's department. It was the main studio used for Blue Peter for the 2007 and 2008 series. It was vacated following the move of both departments to dock10. Studio 2 is formerly the home of the ITV programmes Lorraine, Loose Women and Peston, in addition to Channel 4's Sunday Brunch.
- Studio 3 – 6,390 sq ft (594 m^{2}) – Opened on 29 June 1960, it was designed as a drama studio and had customised panels and fittings. The walls were slightly thicker to insulate it from noise from the Circle and Hammersmith & City lines (then still part of the Metropolitan line) of the London Underground. It was the first studio to be completed and was upgraded to colour in 1969. Between 2018 and 2025, Studio 3 was the home to ITV programmes Good Morning Britain and This Morning. It was one of two studios that hosted the Eurovision Song Contest 1963; the other being Studio 4.

=== Former studios ===
- Studio 0 – 1,260 sq ft (117 m^{2}) – Opened in 1989 as a music studio, it would later become a control room as Studio 12. Productions for UK Play and, later on, virtual reality programmes, were produced here. It was home to Liquid News between 2000 and 2002 and CBeebies in vision continuity between 2002 and 2008, with the studio subsequently used by BBC R&D.
- Studio 4 – 6,300 sq ft (590 m^{2}) – Opened in January 1961, TC4 had a similar layout to TC3, and was designed as a light entertainment studio. It was upgraded for colour production in 1970 and to HDTV and surround sound production in 2008. Programmes such as Z-Cars, Top of the Pops, Strictly Come Dancing, and Room 101 were recorded in TC4.
- Studio 5 – 2,400 sq ft (220 m^{2}) – Opened in August 1961, it was initially used to broadcast programmes from BBC Schools, with an adjacent area used for such programming that was linked to the studio. It was converted for colour production in 1973, and was closed in the mid-1980s. Following a two-year refurbishment in 1987, sports programmes such as Match of the Day, Football Focus, and Grandstand were recorded in TC5 until November 2011, when the Sports department moved to MediaCityUK in Salford.
- Studio 6 – 6,440 sq ft (598 m^{2}) – Coinciding with BBC Two's switch to colour, TC6 opened in July 1967. It was the first such studio to be equipped for colour production. The initial plan was to build a split studio with a large, removable wall in the middle, but this idea was abandoned. Children's programmes such as Live & Kicking and Dick & Dom in da Bungalow, and Pointless were recorded in TC6. Later, the control room of the studio was moved in 1993 and was used as the control room for the Red Button service. It was converted for HDTV production in July 2010, and later became the first 3D-capable studio in Britain.
- Studio 7 – 2,400 sq ft (220 m^{2}) – Opened in 1962, children's programmes such as Going Live! and Play School were initially recorded in TC7. Following BBC News' move to the studio in 1997, news programmes such as BBC Breakfast and BBC News at Six were broadcast, with other news programmes transmitted from various studios in the News Centre. BBC Breakfast ended its broadcast in TC7 on 5 April 2012, with production moving to MediaCityUK, and BBC News at Six ended its broadcast on 15 March 2013, with news programming subsequently moving to Broadcasting House in central London.
- Studio 8 – 6,480 sq ft (602 m^{2}) – Opened in 1967, it was considered, by television producers, the best studio for use, owing to its size. It primarily broadcast comedy programmes, sitcoms and quiz shows such as Miranda, Tipping Point and Five Minutes to a Fortune. It was the first studio to be converted for HDTV production, having done so in January 2007.
- Studio 9 – 900 sq ft (84 m^{2}) – Built in 1955 as a foyer of the restaurant block, it was later converted to a store. It was converted to a studio in 1996 for CBBC, and was cited for its convenience and its roominess. CBBC left the studios in 2004, and all in-vision continuity was moved 2 years later to TC12. Programmes such as Sam & Mark's TMi Friday and SMart were recorded from TC9.

==== Studio 10 ====
111 square metres (1,200 ft^{2})

Opened as N1 in September 1969, it was used for the BBC1 daytime news bulletins, and the home of BBC World (previously BBC World Service News) from 1993. Closed in spring 1999 when news bulletins moved to the News Centre section of Television Centre, and renamed as TC10. Used for some programmes by channel UK Play until the station's closure. Between 2004 and 2006 it was used for in-vision continuity for CBBC on BBC One and BBC Two, before being used by some programming for CBBC such as Level Up. From 2010 to 2011 it was the home of CBeebies.

==== Studio 11 ====
186 square metres (2,000 ft^{2})

Opened as N2 in September 1969, and the same size as N1, it was used for the BBC2 daytime news bulletins. Extended in 1985 to include props store and adjacent lobby, it became home to the Six O'Clock and Nine O'Clock News. In spring 1999, following the completion of the News Centre spur of Television Centre, the news moved out and it was renamed TC11. In 2002 it became home to Liquid News and later to the other BBC Three news programmes 60 Seconds and The 7 O'Clock News. It briefly played host to the domestic BBC News bulletins while their studios were refurbished in 2006, before becoming general purpose. It was home to Strictly Come Dancing: It Takes Two until 15 December 2011, after which the studio was closed.

==== Studio 12 ====
56 square metres (600 ft^{2})

Originally built as a control room for the music studio originally located in Studio 0. Studio 12 was converted into an ad-hoc studio in 2004 for CBBC programmes. It was also used for Sportsround for some years, but was eventually converted into a presentation studio in 2006. It was used for in-vision continuity for CBBC and changed into an in-vision continuity studio in summer 2007. The set was transferred to a mini studio in the East Tower. It was used by BBC Research.

==== Pres A ====
65 square metres (704 ft^{2})

Opened in 1960, designed for in-vision continuity for BBC 1, but was used as such for only three years. Became weather studio prior to the move to the BBC Weather Centre in 1990 (also in Television Centre), following which it was used by Children's BBC to supplement presentation from the 'Broom Cupboard', and was used for slots such as birthdays and public holidays. It became full-time home of Children's BBC in 1994 following the vacation of the 'Broom Cupboard'. It closed following CBBC's move to TC9 and was converted into additional presentation control rooms. The substantially thick wall between Pres A and B was removed and a mezzanine floor constructed to house a larger presentation control area for interactive and children's channels CBBC and CBeebies.

==== Pres B ====
65 square metres (704 ft^{2})

Opened in 1964, Pres B was designed for in-vision continuity for BBC 2, but that channel did not use in-vision continuity for more than a few months after launch. Became a general purpose studio housing small productions such as Points of View, the Film series with Barry Norman and The Old Grey Whistle Test. It closed in 1996 and initially remained disused until it was converted (along with Pres A) into additional presentation control rooms. The substantially thick wall between Pres A and B was removed and a mezzanine floor constructed to house a larger presentation control area for interactive and children's channels CBBC and CBeebies.

==== News studios ====
In addition to these studios, BBC News used a number of studios for the frequent news bulletins. These studios have a different naming system owing to their permanent usage and were not included on most studio lists, as they were unavailable for hire.

- N1 – Previously BBC One daytime bulletins. Became TC10
- N2 – Previously BBC Two daytime bulletins. Became TC11
- N3 – Small studio off main newsroom, before being made part of newsroom, separated by glass panels.
- N4 – Studio, became part of the BBC Club bar
- N5 – Originally studio for BBC Arabic Television service, which closed in 1996. It was a storeroom until 2001 when it was used for the BBCi service, then from 2007 as a home for Click prior to its move to Broadcasting House in 2012.
- N6 – Formerly home to BBC News at One, BBC News at Ten and the BBC News channel.
- N8 – Home to BBC World News prior to its move to Broadcasting House in 2013, and by the BBC News channel from 1999 to 2008. BBC News channel still used the studio to allow the BBC News at Ten to rehearse in N6 until 2013
- N9 – Home to BBC World News until 2008 and BBC News 24 from 1997 to 1999, used as a contingency when N6/N8 unavailable due to technical work and for election coverage
- N10 – Formerly used by BBC Three to produce 60 Seconds

These studios were located in Stage 5 & Stage 6, commonly known as the BBC News Centre. BBC News moved out of Stage 6 in 2013 to the new BBC News Centre at New Broadcasting House in Central London. After redevelopment, Stage 6 became the new home to the commercial arm of the BBC, BBC Studios.

There was no N7, to avoid confusion with TC7, which housed 'big' news programmes such as BBC Breakfast, Working Lunch, and Newsnight.

=== Infrastructure ===
In February 1996, the electricity and heating were transferred to a European Gas Turbines (EGT) 4.9 MWe Typhoon gas turbine combined heating, power and cooling unit. It included a 6 MW Thermax air conditioning (cooling) vapour absorption machine (VAM). The £6 million HVAC system reduced energy costs by 35%, and paid for itself within three years. A second turbine was added, without a second chimney. However, in 2008 the BBC admitted that the energy system was being used for emergency purposes only as it had become cost-ineffective to use full-time. Excess electricity produced at night has not been returned to the National Grid, as originally planned. In November 2003, the turbine's chimneys caught fire, bringing TV output to a halt. After the fire the turbines were no longer used regularly.

== Recent productions ==
=== BBC productions ===
- BBC Radio 1 Teen Awards (TC1: Nov 2019)
- The Graham Norton Show (TC1: 2018–present)
- Later... with Jools Holland (1992–2012; TC1: 2019–2020)
- Mock the Week (TC4: 2005–2012; TC1: 2018–2022)
- QI (TC1: 2019–2025; TC3: 2026–present)
- Sounds Like Friday Night (TC1: 2017–2018)
- Strictly Come Dancing: It Takes Two (TC2: 2017)
- Top Gear (Central Courtyard: 2021–2022)

=== ITV productions ===
- The Chase (TC1: Celebrity Specials, 2019)
- Good Morning Britain (TC3: 2018–2025)
- The Jonathan Ross Show (TC1: 2017–present)
- Loose Women (TC2: 2018–2025)
- Lorraine (TC2: 2018–2025)
- This Morning (TC3: 2018–2025)
- Peston (TC2: 2018–2026)
- Ant & Dec's Saturday Night Takeaway (TC1: 2020–2024)

=== Other productions ===
- Saturday Night Live UK (TC1: 2026–present)
- The Big Narstie Show (TC1: 2018–2022)
- Blind Date (TC1: 2017–2018)
- El Hormiguero (TC1: Special, 2019)
- The Great British Bake Off: An Extra Slice (TC1: 2018–present)
- The Russell Howard Hour (TC1: 2017–2022)
- Sunday Brunch (TC2: 2019–present)
- The Last Leg (TC1: 2018–2021, 2023–present; TC3: 2026–present)
- Your Face or Mine? (TC1: 2019)

== Major events ==
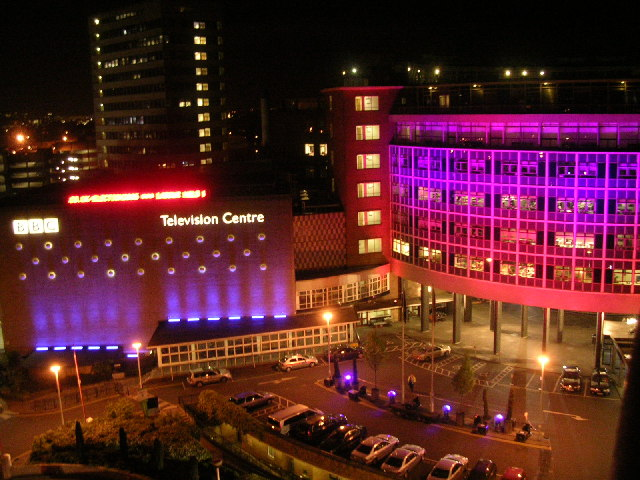
Television Centre on Election Night, 5 May 2005

=== Terrorist target ===
On 4 March 2001, a bomb placed outside the news centre exploded, with no fatalities. It was attributed to the Real IRA and the culprits were eventually caught. The front of the building suffered moderate damage, but was soon repaired.

=== Power failures ===
Television Centre has suffered from power cuts that affected normal broadcasting, but these were not seen as a systemic problem. One such power cut caused the launch night of BBC2, on 20 April 1964, to be cancelled; programmes began the next day.

A major power failure occurred on 20 June 2000 at approximately 5 p.m., affecting the entire Television Centre resulting in services such as BBC One, BBC Two and BBC Radio 4 coming off air and/or altering their schedules. BBC News 24 went off air twice before being relocated to the BBC's Westminster studios and simulcasting with BBC World (marking a rare occurrence where BBC World was broadcast to UK viewers). The Six O'Clock News suffered severe lighting problems and had to be cancelled halfway through, and the BBC's backup generator caught fire. Troubles were experienced in the South East region, as Newsroom South East started later than planned. The fire alarms went off at Television Centre later that day, leaving only a skeleton crew. Eventually many programmes returned, from different locations: Newsnight was presented from the main news studio with intermittent technical problems. The issues were attributed to a failing substation in Shepherd's Bush. Normal services resumed the following day.

Just before 8 a.m. on 28 November 2003 an electrical fault caused some equipment to overheat, which set off fire alarms. Although there was no fire, the fault caused widespread power cuts and prevented backup generators from providing alternative power. All output was affected with services transferred across London to alternative studios. The One O'Clock News and BBC News 24 broadcast for much of the day from the BBC's Millbank Studios, and the Today programme and BBC Radio 5 Live Breakfast morning radio shows fell off air for 15 minutes. The Millbank Studios are a fall-back for news operations in the event of TVC failure, and are continually recording the last hour of the BBC News Channel output (without in-vision clock) for this purpose. This power cut came on the week prior to the relaunch of News 24 as well as BBC World, which was postponed for another week to ensure that all problems had been remedied.

=== Protests ===
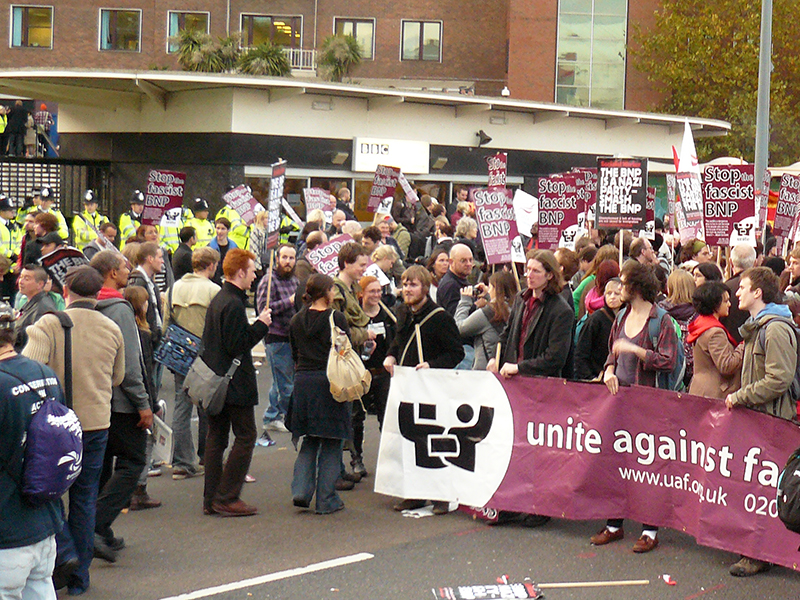
Protesters objecting to the appearance of Nick Griffin on Question Time outside Television Centre in 2009

Programmes have been interrupted by protesters gaining access to Television Centre. In 1988, a group of lesbian protestors campaigning against Section 28 of the Local Government Act 1988 gained access to the studio of the Six O'Clock News during a live broadcast. Newsreader Sue Lawley continued with the broadcast, while co-presenter Nicholas Witchell tackled the intruders off-camera.

On 20 May 2006, during the live broadcast of National Lottery: Jet Set the studio was invaded by members of the Fathers 4 Justice campaign group, causing the show to go briefly off air while the protesters were removed. This was also a problem as that night's lottery broadcast ran straight into the Eurovision Song Contest 2006.

For Question Time on 22 October 2009, the BBC invited the leader of the British National Party, Nick Griffin, onto the programme for the first time, causing heated public debate and strong protests outside the studios. Television Centre had its security breached with around 30 anti-fascist protesters storming the reception area and several hundred protesters gathering outside. Police and security staff were forced to close gates leading into the centre and form barriers to prevent any further breaches of security.

On 9 August 2021, a number of anti-vaccine protestors upset with BBC News for "promoting Covid-19 vaccines" attempted to gain access to Television Centre. The BBC's news operations were not on site as they had left the facility in 2013. Police were deployed to prevent the protestors entering BBC Studioworks, and some of the protesters later marched to Broadcasting House where BBC News is based.

=== 2025 fire ===
On 6 September 2025, a "complex fire" broke out in one of the complex's restaurants. Firefighters from the London Fire Brigade spent twelve hours bringing the conflagration under control, and residents in several neighbouring buildings were evacuated.

Preceded by Villa Louvigny; Luxembourg City	Eurovision Song Contest; Venue; 1963	Succeeded by Tivoli Concert Hall; Copenhagen
Preceded by first venue	Eurovision Dance Contest; Venue; 2007	Succeeded by SECC; Glasgow
