= Barbery =

Barbery may refer to:

- Muriel Barbery (born 1969), Morocco-born French novelist and professor of philosophy
- Barbery, Calvados, France
- Barbery, Oise, France
- The craft of a barber
