= Dessaulles =

Dessaulles is a French Canadian surname. Notable people with the surname include:

- Caroline Dessaulles-Béique (1852–1946), Canadian social activist and feminist
- Georges-Casimir Dessaulles (1827–1930), businessman, statesman, and Canadian senator
- Henriette Dessaulles (1860–1946), Canadian journalist and diarist from Quebec, pioneer of women's writing in Quebec
- Jean Dessaulles (1766–1835), seigneur and political figure in Lower Canada
- Louis-Antoine Dessaulles (1818–1895), Quebec seigneur, journalist, and political figure
