= List of public art in Green Park =

This is a list of public art in Green Park, one of the Royal Parks of London.

Green Park lies between Hyde Park and St James's Park, in the City of Westminster. Much of the present landscaping is the result of remodelling by John Nash in the 1820s, and the park had been cleared of its buildings, dating to the time of Queen Caroline, by 1855. Governments have traditionally been reluctant to situate memorials in the Royal Parks, and there were none in Green Park until the installation of the Canada Memorial in 1994. Since then two further war memorials have been added, with the second (dedicated to the memory of RAF Bomber Command) drawing criticism for "the un-greening of this section of Green Park".

Image	Title / subject	Location and coordinates	Date	Artist / designer	Architect / other	Type	Designation	Notes
More images	Gates	Piccadilly 51.5057°N 0.1446°W	c. 1735	attributed to Jean Montigny	Richard Boyle, 3rd Earl of Burlington	Gates and piers	Grade II*	Wrought-iron gates with piers in the Palladian style, originally from a house at Turnham Green belonging to Lord Heathfield. When this was demolished in 1837 they were bought for Chiswick House, but in 1897 they were removed to Devonshire House, which was owned by the same family. This in turn was demolished in 1921, after which the gates were moved to their present site. Restored in 2000.
More images	Diana Fountain	Near the entrance of Green Park tube station 51.5063°N 0.1423°W	1951	Estcourt James (Jim) Clack	—N/a	Drinking fountain with sculpture	—N/a	Unveiled 30 June 1954 on the site of an earlier fountain by Sydney Smirke. The new work was a gift of the Constance Fund, a trust fund set up in accordance with the wishes of the artist Sigismund Goetze to commission sculpture for London's parks. The fountain was moved to its current, more prominent position in 2011, when some gilding was added.
	Leaves	Green Park tube station, Victoria and Jubilee line platforms	1979	June Fraser	—N/a	Tile motif	—N/a	Fraser's tiling scheme in bright red and green replaced (on the Victoria line platforms) an abstract design of 1969 by Hans Unger, representing a bird's-eye view of trees in Green Park.
More images	Canada Memorial	Green Park 51.5029°N 0.1426°W	1994	Pierre Granche	Ove Arup and Partners	Memorial	—N/a	Unveiled 3 June 1994 by Elizabeth II. A pyramid of Canadian granite bisected by a passageway, forming the shape of an arrow pointing from Halifax, Nova Scotia, whence Canadian soldiers sailed for London in order to fight in both world wars. The inscriptions are in English and French.
More images	Memorial Gates	Constitution Hill 51.5025°N 0.1491°W	2002	—N/a	Liam O'Connor	Four stone pillars supporting lamps and, nearby, a chhatri	—N/a	Unveiled 6 November 2002 by Elizabeth II. Inscribed IN MEMORY OF/ THE FIVE MILLION/ VOLUNTEERS FROM/ THE INDIAN/ SUB-CONTINENT/ AFRICA AND/ THE CARIBBEAN/ WHO FOUGHT WITH/ BRITAIN IN THE TWO/ WORLD WARS
	Sea Strata	Green Park tube station	2011	John Maine	Capita Architecture	Frieze	—N/a	The Portland stone cladding of the service buildings is set in bands to suggest strata in a quarry, with enlarged outlines of fossils incised into the stone at eye level, and spiral forms are incised into the granite pavement.
More images	Watering Holes	Green Park 51.5050°N 0.1465°W	2012	Mark Titman	Robin Monotti Architects	Sculptural drinking fountain	—N/a	One of two winners of an international competition to design "a new, top-quality, low-cost, model drinking fountain", the other being the Trumpet fountain installed in Kensington Gardens.
More images	RAF Bomber Command Memorial	Green Park 51.5033°N 0.1489°W	2012	Philip Jackson	Liam O'Connor	Sculptural group inside pavilion	—N/a	Unveiled 28 June 2012 by Elizabeth II. The memorial is classical in style, but its roof is lined with aluminium from a Halifax bomber, behind a stainless steel lattice inspired by the geodesic fuselage construction of Wellington bombers.

== Bibliography ==
- Bradley, Simon; Pevsner, Nikolaus (2003). London 6: Westminster. The Buildings of England. London and New Haven: Yale University Press. ISBN 978-0-300-09595-1.
- Ovenden, Mark (2013). London Underground by Design. London: Penguin. ISBN 978-1846144172.
- Ward-Jackson, Philip (2011). Public Sculpture of Historic Westminster: Volume 1. Public Sculpture of Britain. Vol. 14. Liverpool: Liverpool University Press. ISBN 978-1-84631-691-3.
