= Caroline Dessaulles-Béique =

Canadian social activist and feminist (1852-1946)

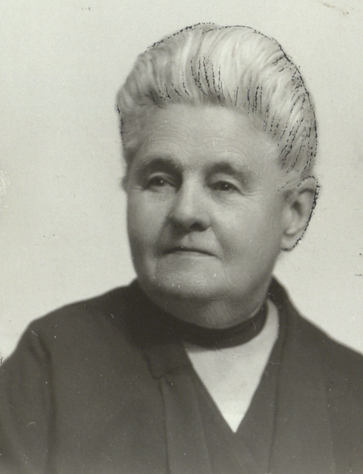
- Béique, c. 1940
- Born: Carolina-Angélina Dessaulles; 13 October 1852; Saint-Hyacinthe, Canada East
- Died: 8 August 1946 (aged 93); Montreal, Quebec, Canada
- Other name: Caroline Béïque
- Occupations: Social activist, feminist
- Years active: 1893–1940

Caroline Dessaulles-Béique (a.k.a. Madame F. L. Beique, 13 October 1852 – 8 August 1946) was a Canadian social activist and feminist. She was one of the founders of the Provincial Housewife's School (French: L'École Ménagère Provinciale), which later became the home economics department of the Université de Montréal, and an advocate who pressed for the founding of juvenile courts. She was a co-founder of the first national feminist organization, the National Federation of Saint John the Baptist (French: Fédération nationale Saint-Jean-Baptiste) for French-speaking Canadian women.

== Early life ==
Carolina-Angélina Dessaulles was born on 13 October 1852 in Saint-Hyacinthe, Canada East, to Catherine-Zéphirine (née Thompson) and Louis-Antoine Dessaulles. Her father was a prominent politician, lawyer, and writer in Quebec and had served as mayor of Saint-Hyacinthe. Her uncle Georges-Casimir Dessaulles was also a mayor of Saint-Hyacinthe and went on to serve in the Legislative Assembly of Quebec and the Senate of Canada; his daughter Henriette Dessaulles, Caroline's cousin, became a noted writer. Her mother was a distant cousin to her father, through her mother, Flavia Truteau, who was connected to the distinguished Papineau family, like her father's ancestry. Dessaulles and her family moved to Montreal in 1860, where she attended the Ladies of the Sacred Heart school. On 15 April 1875 at Saint-Jacques Cathedral in Montreal, she married Frédéric-Liguori Béique, a lawyer who became president of the bar association and a senator. The couple raised their six children in Montreal.

== Career ==
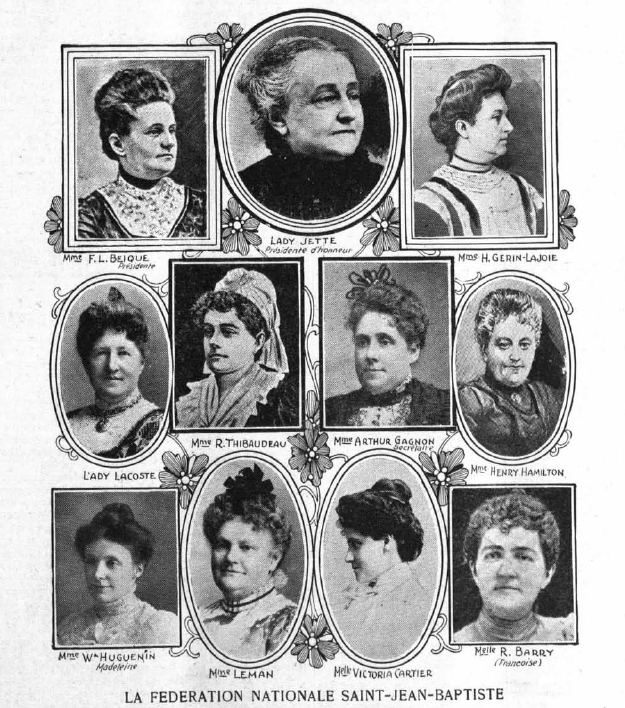
Federation nationale Saint-Jean-Baptiste 1907

Dessaulles-Béique began working as a social activist in 1893, when she became involved in founding the Montreal Local Council of Women (MLCW), a subsidiary organization of the National Council of Women of Canada (NCWC). In 1899, Frédéric became president of the Société Saint-Jean-Baptiste and four years later, Dessaulles-Béique established the first women's organization that catered to preserving the culture of the French-speaking women of Canada. Des dames patronesses de l'Association Saint-Jean-Baptiste (the ladies' patronage committee of the association of Saint-Jean-Baptiste) provided women a way to become involved in the promotion of French-Canadian interests, including preservation of the French language and Catholicism. The committee, with Dessaulles-Béique as its president, was responsible for the founding of the Provincial Housewife's School (French: L'École Ménagère Provinciale) in 1906. The school served as a normal school, but also included courses to teach students how to cook, sew, manage a household, and offered classes on hygiene.

In 1907, Dessaulles-Béique and Marie Gérin-Lajoie expanded the Patronage Committee to the national level, founding the National Federation of Saint John the Baptist (FNSJB), for which Dessaulles-Béique served as president until 1913. The FNSJB served as an umbrella organization, uniting twenty-two women's social activist organizations. Their interests included access to education for women, aid to the poor and unemployed, Civil Code reforms, temperance, worker housing and other issues. Some of the projects that Dessaulles-Béique and the FNSJB were involved in were pressing for creation of the juvenile court system, working with the Sainte-Justine Hospital, and the distribution of milk and maternal assistance programs like Drops of Milk. From 1909 to 1910, Dessaulles-Béique simultaneously served on the executive board of the Montreal Local Council of Women.

In 1913, she resigned as president of FNSJB to turn her attention to war work, becoming involved in both the Canadian Red Cross and the Khaki League, an assistance organization for returning veterans. When World War I ended, she returned to women's programs, and was among the founders of the Provincial Committee for Women's Suffrage (French: Comité provincial pour le suffrage féminin, CPSF) in 1922. The women who joined the CPSF were primarily members of two older feminist groups, the Montreal Suffrage Association and the FNSJB. Besides Dessaulles-Béique and Gérin-Lajoie, among the founding members of CPSF were Thérèse Casgrain, Carrie Derick, Grace Ritchie-England, Idola Saint-Jean, and Isabella Scott. For the women of the FNSJB, this was a significant change in stance, as the organization had been formed with approval by the pope to train women in their moral and civic responsibilities as wives, rather than as individual citizens. The struggle for the right to vote in Quebec continued to 1940, when women won full suffrage.

== Death and legacy ==
Dessaulles-Béique died on 8 August 1946 in Montreal. The Housewife's School which she founded became affiliated with the Université de Montréal in 1937 and in 1953 became the School of Household Science. In 1959, it merged with the University when the school decided to offer a degree in home economics. In 1988, a street in the city was renamed in her honour.
