= Papineau =

Papineau may refer to:

== Places ==
=== Canada ===
- Papineau Regional County Municipality, Quebec
- Papineau (electoral district), a federal electoral district within Montreal
- Papineau station on the Montréal Métro.
- Papineau (provincial electoral district), a provincial electoral district in Quebec (Outaouais region)

=== United States ===
- Papineau, Illinois

== Other uses ==
- Papineau (surname)
- Papineau (horse), a thoroughbred racehorse
