= McCord Stewart Museum =

Museum in Montreal, Quebec, Canada

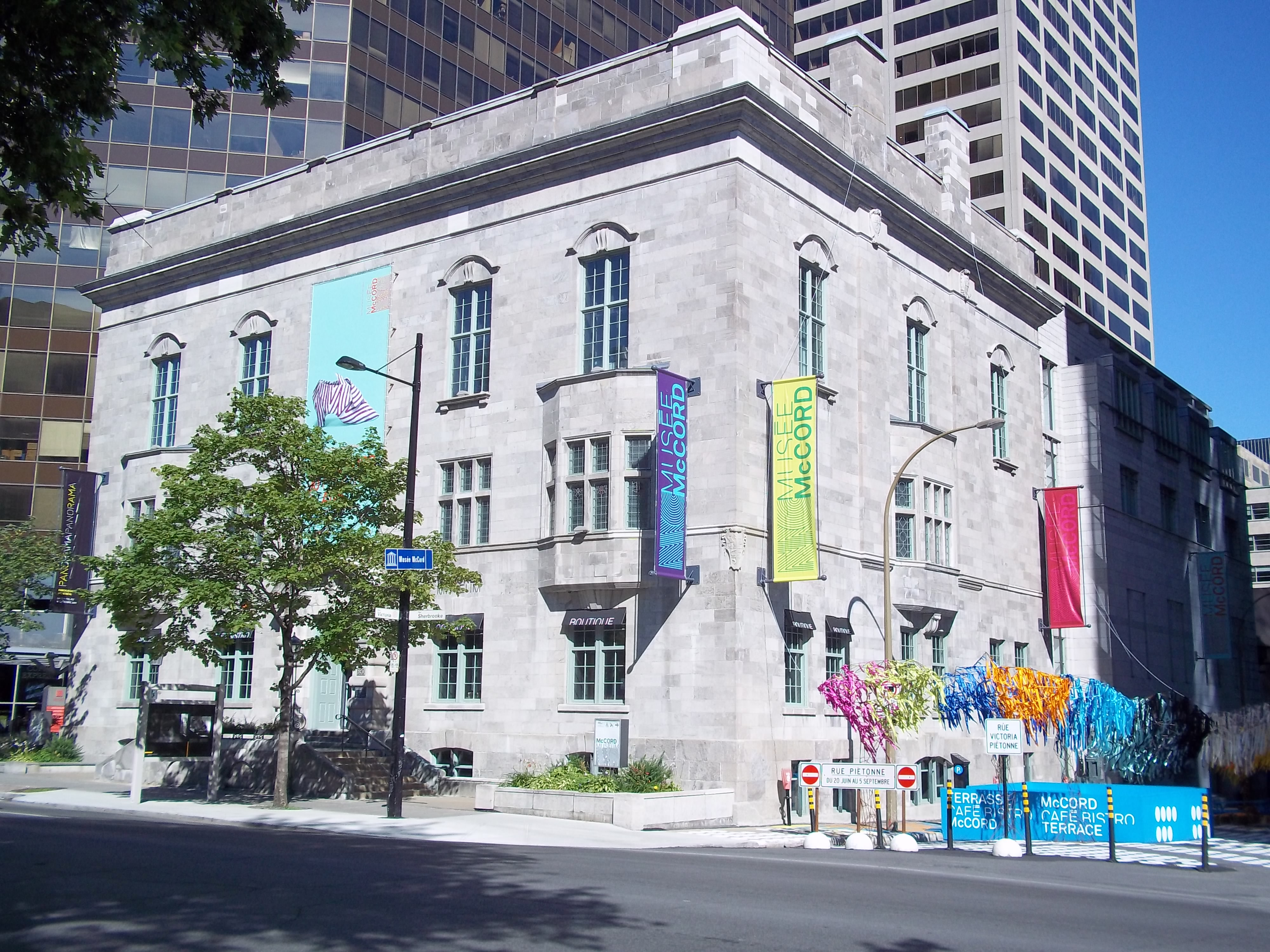
- The McCord Stewart Museum

- Location in Montreal
- Established: October 13, 1921
- Location: 690 Sherbrooke Street West; Montreal, Quebec; H3A 1E9
- Coordinates: 45.5044°N 73.5737°W
- Type: History museum
- Collection size: 2,5 million objects, images and manuscripts
- Visitors: 150 000 indoors (2022)
- President: Anne Eschapasse
- Public transit access: at McGill
- Website: www.musee-mccord-stewart.ca/en/

The McCord Stewart Museum (French: Musée McCord Stewart), formerly known as the McCord Museum of Canadian History, is a public research and teaching museum dedicated to the study of social history and the history of Montreal. It was founded in 1921 by David Ross McCord and is based on his own family collection of objects. The Museum’s Archives, Documentary Art, Dress, Fashion and Textiles, Indigenous Cultures, Material Culture and Photography collections, containing 3 million images, objects, documents and works of art, position it as the custodian of a remarkable historical heritage. It is located directly across the street from McGill University, in the downtown core of Montreal, Quebec, Canada.

== History ==
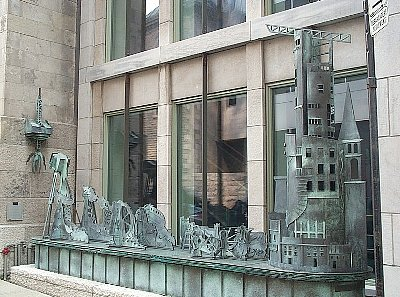
Totem urbain / histoire en dentelle, a Pierre Granche sculpture, museum exterior.

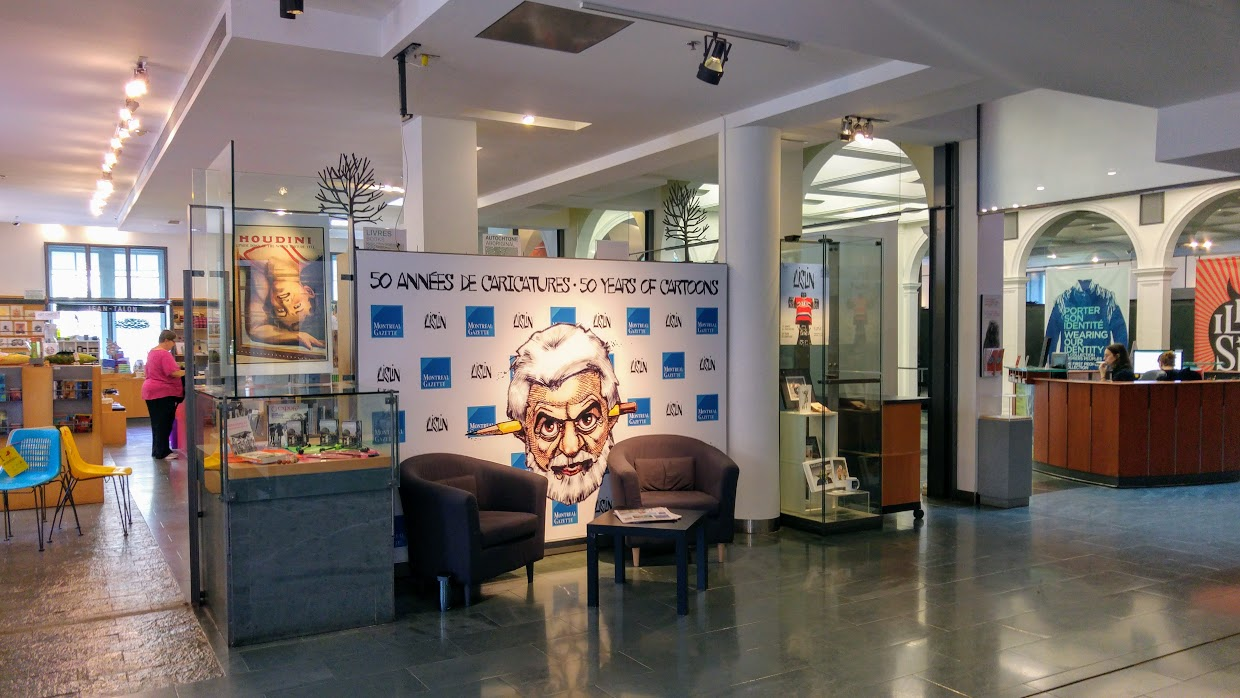
Pop-up exhibit in lobby (2017)

On October 13, 1921, the McCord National Museum, as it was then called, moved to the former McGill Union building, designed by Percy Erskine Nobbs in the Arts and Crafts tradition. The collection was based on the McCord family collection. Since 1878, David Ross McCord had been adding to the already considerable collection assembled by his family since their arrival in Canada. Over the years, he developed the plan of founding a national history museum in Montreal, at that time Canada's metropolis.

On August 31, 2022, the museum was renamed the McCord Stewart Museum. This followed the permanent closure of the Stewart Museum in February 2021 and the integration of its collection into that of the McCord Museum. The Stewart collection consisted of approximately 27,000 artefacts related to the European presence in New France and North America.

The building that now houses the museum was administered by McGill University for over sixty years, when it was the seat of the student government. After riots targeted at the Students' Society of McGill University (SSMU) led to the building's storming and several executives being taken hostage, McGill University set out to build a more secure building, University Centre, the current seat of SSMU.

Leading members of the community lent their support to the museum over the years. Today, the McCord Stewart Museum is supported by the governments of Canada, Quebec and Montreal, and by a large network of members, donors and sponsors.

== Museum's Exterior Public Space ==
The museum's exterior features the sculpture Totem urbain / histoire en dentelle, an allegorical representation of Montreal history, by Pierre Granche.

Additionally, The McCord Stewart Museum’s back alley is used as a space for Montreal locals or visitors to meet, and come together.

Its goal is to establish a community downtown, given that it’s open 12 months during the year. It was created by the architecture company Kanva, which allows the public to be immersed in an “imaginary world.” It includes a mural. Murals were once very common in the downtown Montreal area, but vanished over time in the second half of the 20th century.

With the help of the Oglivy department store, which has been in partnership with the Museum for more than 75 years, three festive exhibitions are on display outside and inside the Museum around Christmastime.

== Collection ==
=== Online Collections ===
The museum offers an open-access platform with over 185,000 images, objects, and documents. Its Online Collections allow visitors to download 155,000 high-resolution, royalty-free images free of charge and without submitting a request. If archival documents or images are protected by copyright, users can submit an access request by contacting the museum. Users may also request high-resolution images that are not in the public domain for a fee. It is important to note that not all objects held by the museum have been added to the online collection.

The online archive is organized into several sections, including Archives, which contains documents detailing the histories of specific individuals, families, and organizations; Documentary Art, featuring paintings, engravings, and drawings; Dress, Fashion, and Textiles, documenting clothing and textiles from different periods in Canadian history; Indigenous Cultures, containing clothing, objects, and equipment related to Indigenous cultures; Material Culture, featuring everyday household items and other objects; and Photography, which includes collections of Canadian photographers, photographic albums, and portfolios.

Publicly accessible collections are an effective prerequisite for the survival of Indigenous history and support cultural preservation. The majority of this Online Collection may serve as an example of the Open Access Movement (OAM), which highlights the importance of unrestricted access to scholarly resources.

=== Archives ===
The Archive collection, which total 348 linear meters, and 3,670 rare books includes manuscripts, correspondence, personal journals, legal documents, brochures, cartography, and other documents that portray Canadian social history spanning from the 17th to the 20th century.

Several documents from the Archive collection are fonds that were retrieved from prominent families and individuals like the Dessaulles, McCord, Armstrong-Deligny-Philips and Bacon families, as well as Sir George-Étienne Cartier, Maurice-Régis Blondeau, Hélène Baillargeon Côté). Others were taken from companies and associations like the Women's Art Society of Montreal, Victoria Rifles of Canada and Gibb & Co.

=== Documentary Art ===
The Documentary Art collection totals almost 120,000 images which illustrate the personalities, places and events that made the history of Montreal, Quebec and Canada, from the 18th to the 21st centuries.

It includes paintings (oils, acrylics and watercolours, mostly from the 19th century), miniatures, silhouettes, prints (maps, plans, portraits, mostly from 1751 to 1900) and caricatures from the 19th, 20th and 21st centuries (John Collins, Serge Chapleau and Terry Mosher alias Aislin).

=== Dress, Fashion and Textiles ===
This collection of 27,000 garments and accessories consists of women's dresses, parasols, hats, fans and footwear, many created by some of Montreal's greatest 20th century designers. The menswear in the collection includes suits, coats and accessories. It also carries an important selection of embroidered samplers, quilts and other textiles, including North America's oldest known patchwork quilt (1726).

In 2019, the museum launched EncycloFashionQC, an online encyclopedia that expanded on the first Quebec fashion encyclopedic reference book, Dicomode, published in 2004. The new version contains over 500 entries about individuals and organizations who have or continue to operate in Quebec for at least five years and have in some way impacted the fashion industry.

=== Indigenous Cultures ===
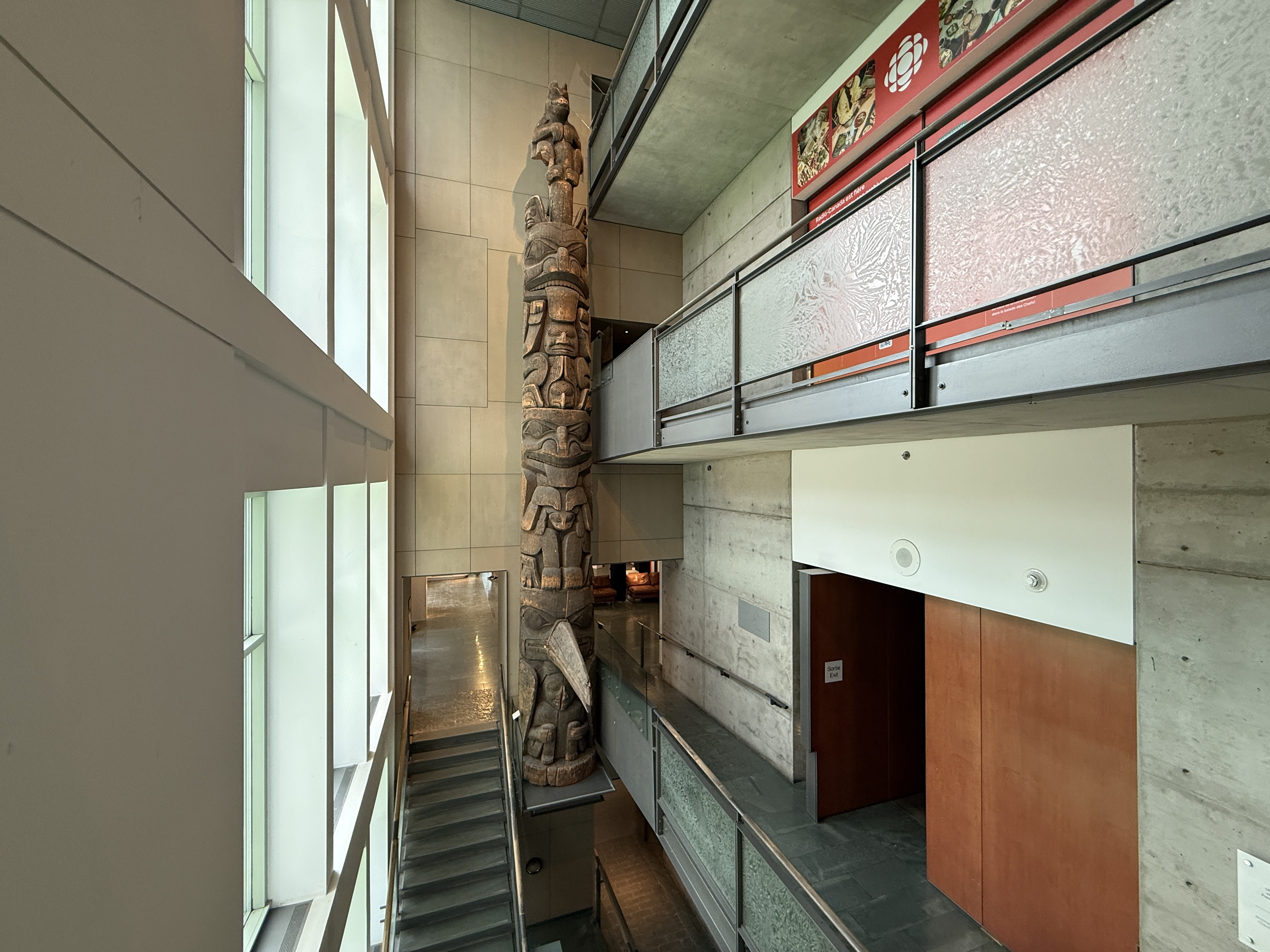
Totem pole inside the museum

The Indigenous Cultures collection of more than 16,000 objects document many aspects of the ways of life, arts, cultures and traditions of the First Nations, Inuit and Métis people living primarily in Canada but also in regions of the United States, Siberia and Greenland.

The collection includes more than 4,000 cultural indigenous objects such as clothing, accessories, headgear, domestic tools, baskets, hunting weaponry, etc. that date all the way from the late 18th century to the 21st. Additionally, the collection also carries more than 8,500 archaeological objects like stones tools and potsherds, dating from about 10,000 years ago to the 16th century which were found primarily in what is today know and referred to as Ontario and Quebec.

The McCord Museum worked with Indigenous peoples to increase accessibility and ensure that the presentation of museum artifacts aligns with Indigenous communities' concerns and perspectives. Museum staff consulted Indigenous researchers, artists, activists, and Elders to incorporate local and community knowledge into their database. Some artifacts are not visible to the public due to community concerns and requests. Indigenous individuals are also able to request private access to items from their own cultures.

=== Material Culture ===
The Material Culture collection comprises more than 63,000 objects that document the domestic environment of Montrealers, Quebeckers and Canadians who lived throughout the last three centuries.

This collection showcases furniture, glassware, ceramics, ironware, sculpture, hunting equipment, sports equipment, items of folk art and a major collection of 19th century toys.

=== Photography ===
The Photography collection consists of more than 3 million images and includes other photographic objects such as prints and glass negatives, stereograms, composites, painted photographs, daguerreotypes and other types of early photographic processes, family albums, vernacular photographs, documentary photographs, artist portfolios, cameras and photographic equipment from the 1840s to the present day.

=== Notman Photographic Archives ===
The Notman Photographic Archives collection includes 400,000 photographs and 200,000 glass negatives from the William Notman & Son Photographic Studio dating mostly from the studio's time of operation between 1856 and 1935. It provides a visual history of Montreal and Canada from the 1840s to the present.

Additionally, in April 2025, UNESCO included the Notman Photographic Archive on the Memory of the World International Register which ensures the safety and promotion of documents that represent heritage and history.

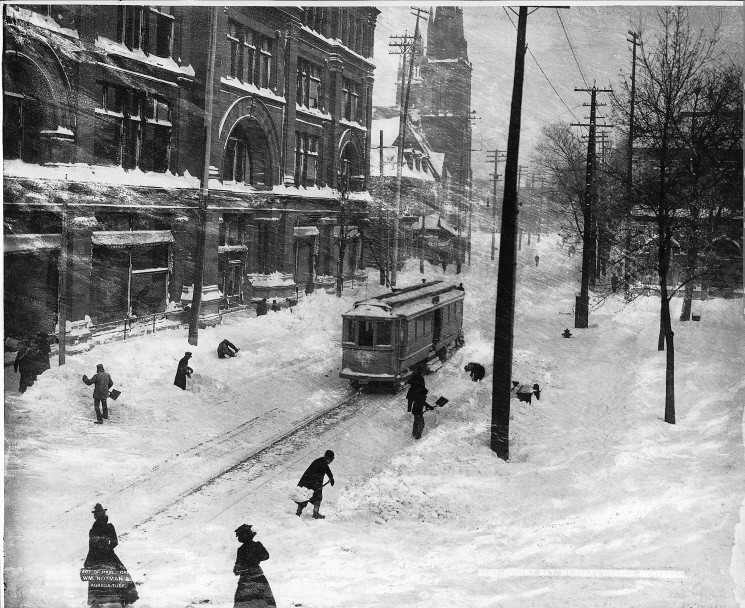
Photography by Wm. Notman & Son: Stormy day, Saint Catherine Street, Montreal, Quebec, Canada

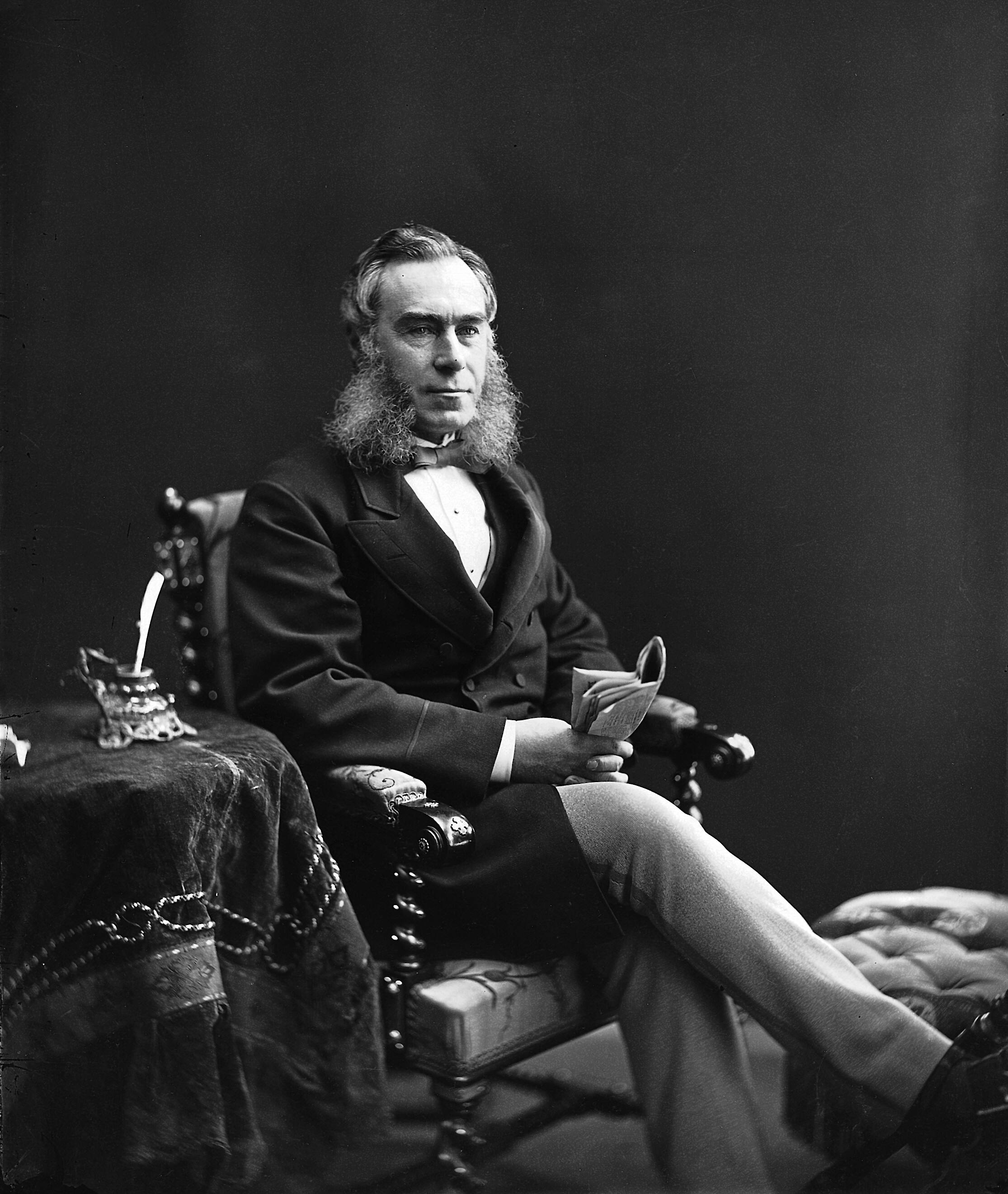
Photography by William Notman: portrait of Peter Redpath, 1871

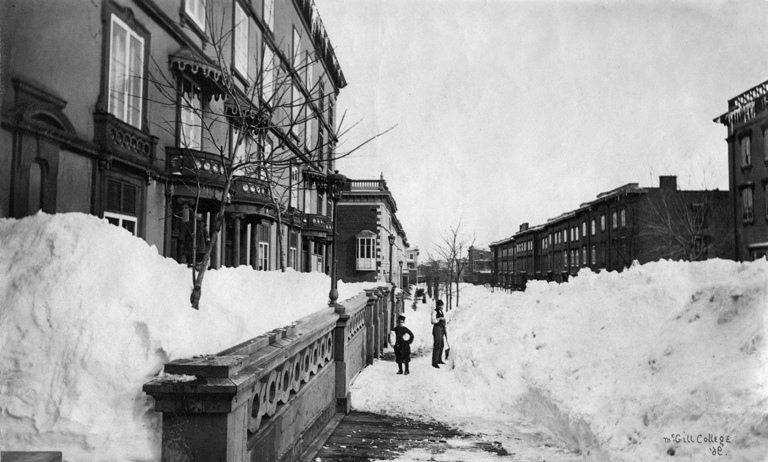
Photography by Alexander Henderson: McGill College Avenue, looking south from Sherbrooke Street, Montreal, 1869

== Activities Administered by the Museum ==
The museum provides a series of activities for visitors to supplement its permanent exhibitions on Indigenous culture. These include markets, talks, events, and workshops.

The museum welcomes marketplace events during which local artists set up tables to present and sell their work. Visitors can engage with artists regarding their inspiration and art, as well as purchase pieces from them.

The museum also organizes talks and symposiums on a variety of topics connected to Indigenous culture and art. For example, the museum has hosted a symposium on the making of indigenous art from its inspirations to techniques and understanding of the art itself.

Starting in November 2026, the museum will host the first Sovereignty Kiki Ball, meant to merge Indigenous cultures and self-determination with the local Ballroom and Kiki scene. This ball celebrates sovereignty, an important theme in studies of Indigenous culture, which is defined as the inherent right to govern one’s territory and resources. The ball will draw on parallels between the struggles for autonomy and self-expression faced by Indigenous and Ballroom communities. The museum will also host a runway event meant to showcase Indigenous fashion and creators.

The museum hosts family workshops, inviting parents and children to come and explore local culture. Workshops can be based on art, the environment, or other aspects of Indigenous culture.

There are also guided tours organized by the museum to guide the public through exhibitions and offer them additional information on different displays.

== Bibliography ==
- (in English) Exhibition Catalogue (1992). Wrapped in the Colours of the Earth.Cultural Heritage of the First Nations. McCord Museum. ISBN 1-895615-07-0.
- (in English) Exhibition Catalogue (1992). Form and Fashion. Nineteenth-Century Montreal Dress. McCord Museum. ISBN 1-895615-00-3.
- (in English) Exhibition Catalogue (1992). The McCord Family. A Passionate Vision. McCord Museum. ISBN 978-0-7735-6373-5.
- (in English) Exhibition Catalogue (1992). Eclectic Tastes. Fine and Decorative Arts from the McCord. McCord Museum. ISBN 1-895615-02-X.
