= David Wark =

Canadian politician (1804–1905)

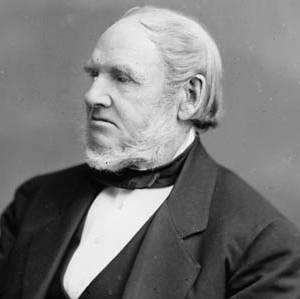
- David Wark; Source: Library and Archives Canada

Member of the Senate of Canada
- In office 1867–1905
- Preceded by: William Hales Hingston
- Succeeded by: Rodolphe Lemieux

Personal details
- Born: February 19, 1804 Derry, Ireland
- Died: August 20, 1905 (aged 101) Fredericton, New Brunswick
- Party: Liberal Party of Canada
- Occupation: Merchant

David Wark (February 19, 1804 – August 20, 1905) was an Irish-born Canadian Senator who served nearly 38 years in office.

He represented Kent County in the Legislative Assembly of New Brunswick from 1843 to 1850. In 1847, he introduced a resolution calling for free trade among the British North American colonies and was, therefore, among the first to seek the closer relations among the colonies that eventually led, 20 years later, to Confederation.

Wark was named to the Legislative Council in 1850 and served until Confederation. He served in the province's Executive Council as a minister without portfolio from 1858 to 1862 and as Receiver General from 1866 to 1867.

Wark was named Senator by a Royal Proclamation in 1867. Known as the "Grand Old Man of the Canadian Senate", he served until his death at the age of 101. At the time of his demise, Wark was the longest lived legislator in the world; he was later surpassed by another Canadian Senator, Georges-Casimir Dessaulles, who died in 1930 at the age of 102.

== Family background ==
David Wark's family originated in Scotland, but his forebears emigrated to Ireland in the early 17th century as part of an organized colonization known as the Plantation of Ulster. His father was a farmer near Derry and David Wark was born there on February 19, 1804. He received his elementary education in Derry schools before pursuing more advanced studies under the supervision of the resident Presbyterian clergyman.

== Emigration and business career ==
In 1825, at the age of 21, Wark emigrated to eastern New Brunswick's Richibucto, Rexton area where he worked as a bookkeeper for local merchants and for six years, taught their children. By 1836, he had saved enough money to buy his own general store and later, he began a successful, 40-year career in the lumber business. His long public service career began when he was appointed county magistrate and then, a judge in the Court of Common Pleas.

== Political career ==
In 1842, Wark was elected to the Legislative Assembly of New Brunswick as a Liberal. He was re-elected in 1846. In 1850, he was appointed to the upper house or Legislative Council of New Brunswick where he served for 16 years. During that time, he was appointed to the cabinet or Executive Council of New Brunswick as Minister Without Portfolio (1858-1862) and Receiver General (1866-1867).

When New Brunswick joined Confederation in 1867, Wark was appointed to the Senate of Canada. He sat in the Senate for 37 years, nine months and 28 days until his death in 1905. During his time there, he served continuously as a member of the powerful standing committee on banking, commerce and railways which became the standing committee on banking and commerce in 1875.

By 1871, he had earned enough money to retire from business pursuits and move to Fredericton.
