= Jean Dessaulles =

Canadian politician (1766-1835)

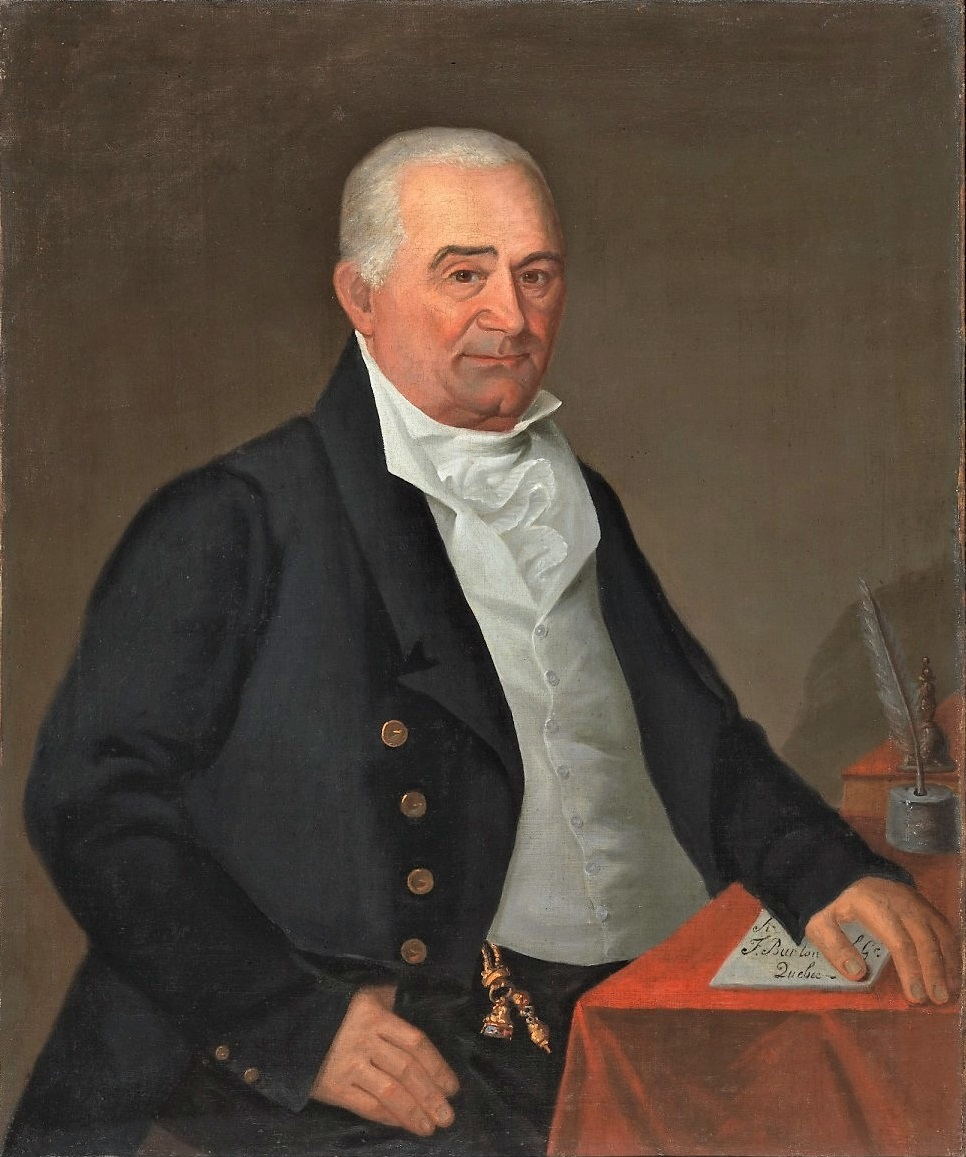
Portrait of Jean Dessaulles, c. 1825

Jean Dessaulles (1766 – June 20, 1835) was a seigneur and political figure in Lower Canada.

He was born in Saint-François-du-Lac in 1766 and studied at the Collège Saint-Raphaël. He worked as a seigneurial agent for his aunt, who was managing the seigneury of Saint-Hyacinthe. Dessaulles served as major in the local militia during the War of 1812, taking command of the battalion when his cousin Hyacinthe-Marie Delorme, then serving as lieutenant-colonel, became ill. In 1814, he inherited part of the seigneury of Saint-Hyacinthe after Delorme died. He married Marie-Rosalie, daughter of Joseph Papineau, in 1816. He was also elected to the Legislative Assembly of Lower Canada for Richelieu in the same year and continued to represent the region until 1830. He represented Saint-Hyacinthe, formerly part of Richelieu, in the legislative assembly from 1830 to 1832, when he was named to the Legislative Council. Dessaulles helped support the operation of the college at Saint-Hyacinthe.

He died in Saint-Hyacinthe in 1835.

His son Louis-Antoine went on to become a journalist and a member of the Legislative Council and his son Georges-Casimir served in the Quebec legislative assembly and in the Senate of Canada. Both sons served terms as mayors of Saint-Hyacinthe. Georges-Casimir's daughter Henriette Dessaulles became a noted writer and journalist under the pen name Fadette, while Louis-Antoine's daughter Caroline Dessaulles-Béique became one of Quebec's first prominent feminist activists.
