= Dominique Mondelet (seigneur) =

Canadian politician (1799–1863)

Dominique Mondelet (January 23, 1799 – February 19, 1863) was a lawyer, judge, seigneur and political figure in Lower Canada.

He was born in Saint-Marc-sur-Richelieu, the son of notary Jean-Marie Mondelet, and studied at the Collège de Montréal. He articled in law with Michael O'Sullivan, was admitted to the bar in 1820 and set up practice in Montreal. Mondelet served as major in the local militia from 1820 to 1827. He was elected to the Legislative Assembly of Lower Canada for Montreal County as a moderate Reformer in an 1831 by-election held after the death of Joseph Perrault. In 1832, he was named King's Counsel. Also in 1832, he was named an honorary member of the Executive Council and he was expelled from his seat by a vote of the assembly. Mondelet was later named to the Special Council that administered the province after the Lower Canada Rebellion. In 1839, he was named judge in the Court of Queen's Bench at Trois-Rivières. Mondelet inherited the seigneuries of Saint-Michel-d'Yamaska (also known as Yamaska) and Boucherville. In 1850, he was named to the Superior Court at Trois-Rivières.

He married Harriet Munro, granddaughter of Captain John Munro. His daughter Émilie-Emma married Georges-Casimir Dessaulles, who later became a Canadian senator; their daughter Henriette Dessaulles became a noted writer and journalist. His brother Charles-Elzéar was also a lawyer and a judge.

Mondelet translated the Canadian Boat Song by Thomas Moore into French. He died of a stroke at Trois-Rivières in 1863.
