= Frédéric Liguori Béique =

Canadian politician (1845-1933)

The Honourable Frédéric Liguori Béique
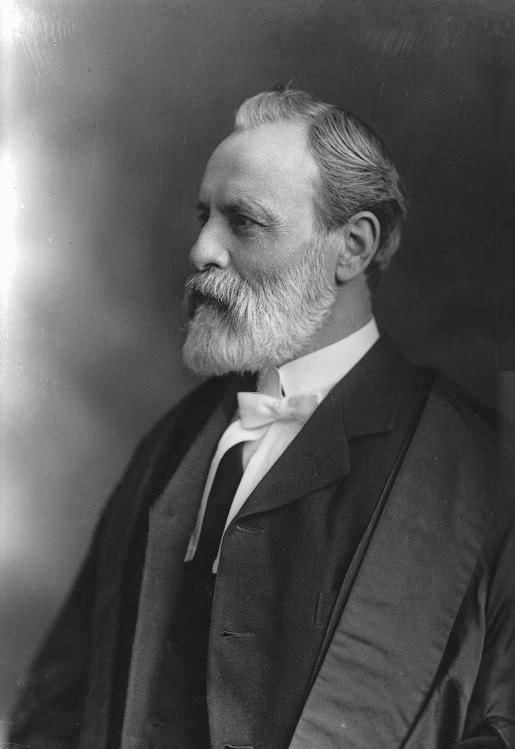

Senator for De Salaberry, Quebec
- In office 1902–1933
- Appointed by: Wilfrid Laurier
- Preceded by: Joseph-Octave Villeneuve
- Succeeded by: Guillaume-André Fauteux

Personal details
- Born: May 20, 1845 St-Mathias, Canada East
- Died: September 12, 1933 (aged 88)
- Resting place: Notre Dame des Neiges Cemetery
- Party: Liberal
- Committees: Chair, Special Committee on Civil Service (1924)

Frédéric Liguori Béique, PC (May 20, 1845 – September 12, 1933) was a Canadian lawyer and politician.

Born in Saint-Mathias, Quebec, he was trained as a lawyer and was called to the Quebec Bar in 1868. On 15 April 1875 at Saint-Jacques Cathedral in Montreal, he married Carolina-Angélina Dessaulles, with whom he would have ten children From 1899 to 1905, he was the president of the Saint-Jean-Baptiste Society. In 1902, he was appointed to the Senate of Canada representing senatorial division of De Salaberry, Quebec. A Liberal, he served until his death in 1933. In 1932, Béique nominated Raoul Dandurand for the Nobel Prize in Peace.

After his death in 1845, he was entombed at the Notre Dame des Neiges Cemetery in Montreal.
