= David Ross McCord =

Canadian lawyer and philanthropist (1844–1930)

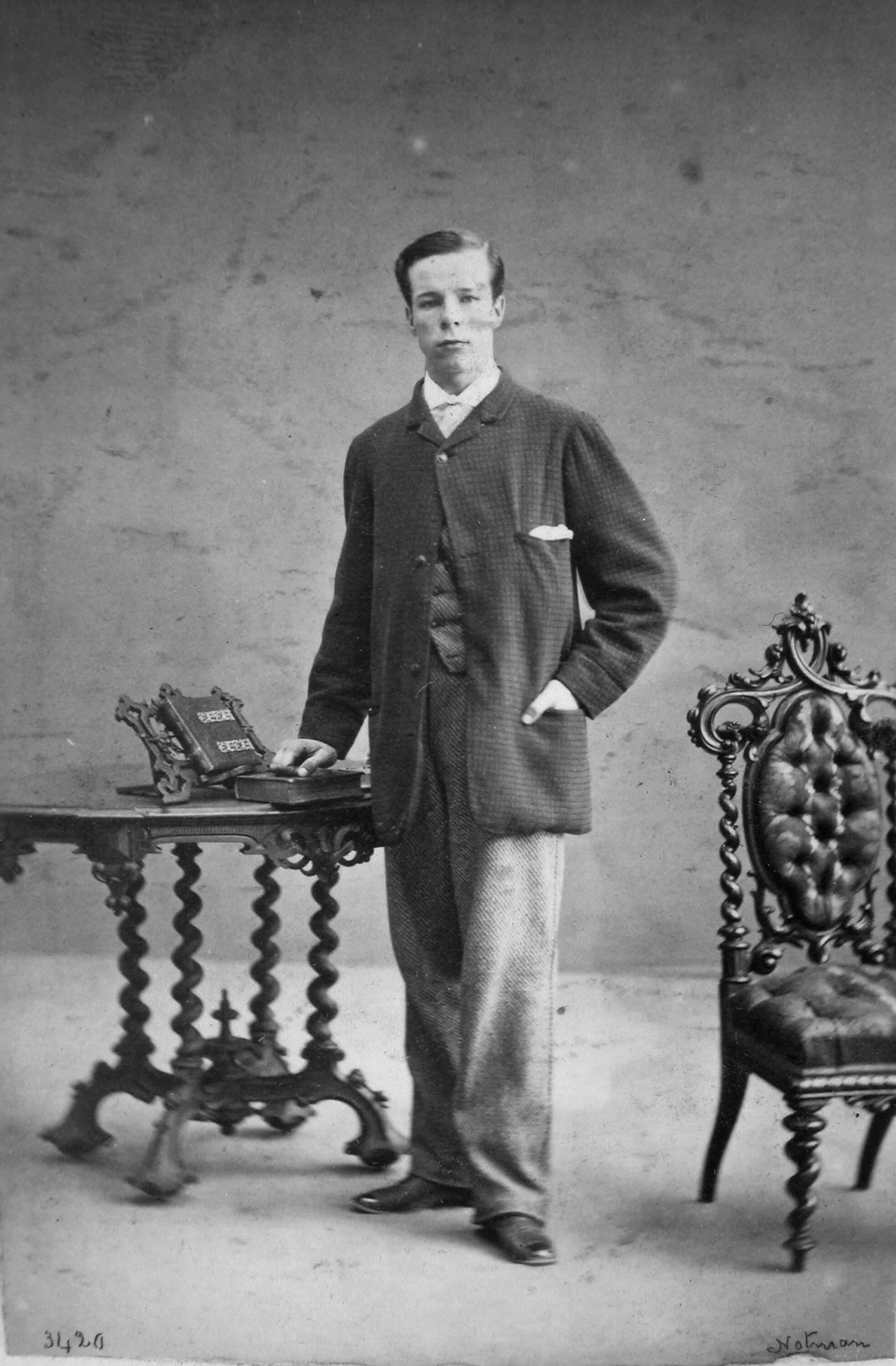
- David Ross McCord, by William Notman, 1862
- Born: David Ross McCord; 18 March 1844; Montreal, Quebec, Canada
- Died: 12 April 1930 (aged 86); Guelph, Ontario, Canada
- Occupation: lawyer

David Ross McCord, KC (18 March 1844 – 12 April 1930) was a Canadian lawyer and philanthropic founder of the McCord Museum in Montreal, Quebec, Canada.

== Life and career ==
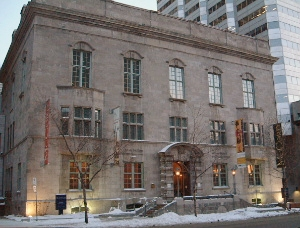
The eponymous museum founded by David McCord.

McCord was born in Montreal to a family of lawyers and businessmen of Irish origin who had emigrated to Canada around the year 1760. He was the fourth child of John Samuel McCord (1801–1865), Judge of the Supreme Court, and Anne Ross, a daughter of David Ross (1770–1837) Q.C., of Montreal, Seigneur of St. Gilles de Beaurivage. His parents, in an upper class, bilingual marriage, inculcated in McCord a love of art (his father was a connoisseur and his mother was an accomplished watercolour artist) and science from an early age. Educated at the High School of Montreal, on leaving school he decided to continue the family tradition and study law at McGill University, eventually becoming a magistrate who gained fame by intervening on behalf of the Aboriginal peoples in Canada.

In 1878, McCord proposed the establishment of a national museum for Canadian history in his maternal city. His collection was first housed in his home and in 1919 his collection was moved to Jesse Joseph House on the McGill University campus. On October 13, 1921, the McCord Museum opened its doors with a collection of 15,000 artifacts from McCord's personal collections. Nine years later, McCord died in Guelph, Ontario. Upon his death, the university took charge of the museum, which today has more than 1.2 million objects.

McCord married Letitia Caroline Chambers (1841–1928). They lived at the old McCord family home, Temple Grove, on the Côte-des-Neiges, Montreal. They are buried together in the Mount Royal Cemetery.

In 2005, the Government of Canada Historic Sites and Monuments Board, placed a plaque outside the McCord Museum in Montreal that reads:

David McCord created one of the earliest and most important collections of objects, images and manuscripts associated with the history of Canada. Convinced that an understanding of the past strengthens national identity, he devoted most of his life and personal fortune to gathering and documenting some 15,000 items related to Aboriginal, French and British history in North America. This man of vision bequeathed his outstanding collection to McGill University, which fulfilled his dream of founding a museum for the benefit of all Canadians.
