= Pierre Granche =

French-Canadian sculptor

- Born: March 14, 1948; Montreal
- Died: September 30, 1997 (aged 49); Montreal
- Education: École de Beaux-Arts de Montréal and the Université de Vincennes in Paris,
- Known for: sculptor, educator.

Pierre Granche (French pronunciation: [pjɛʁ ɡʁɑ̃ʃ]; March 14, 1948 – September 30, 1997) was a French-Canadian sculptor. Having studied at the École des Beaux-Arts de Montréal and the Université de Vincennes in Paris, he taught in the art history department of the Université de Montréal for more than twenty years (1975–1997) until his death from lung cancer in Montreal.

As a sculptor, his works are mainly abstract semi-representational pieces, many in aluminium. He was highly influential in the Quebec art world for his method of integrating art and architecture.

== Public artworks ==
Some of his public artworks include:

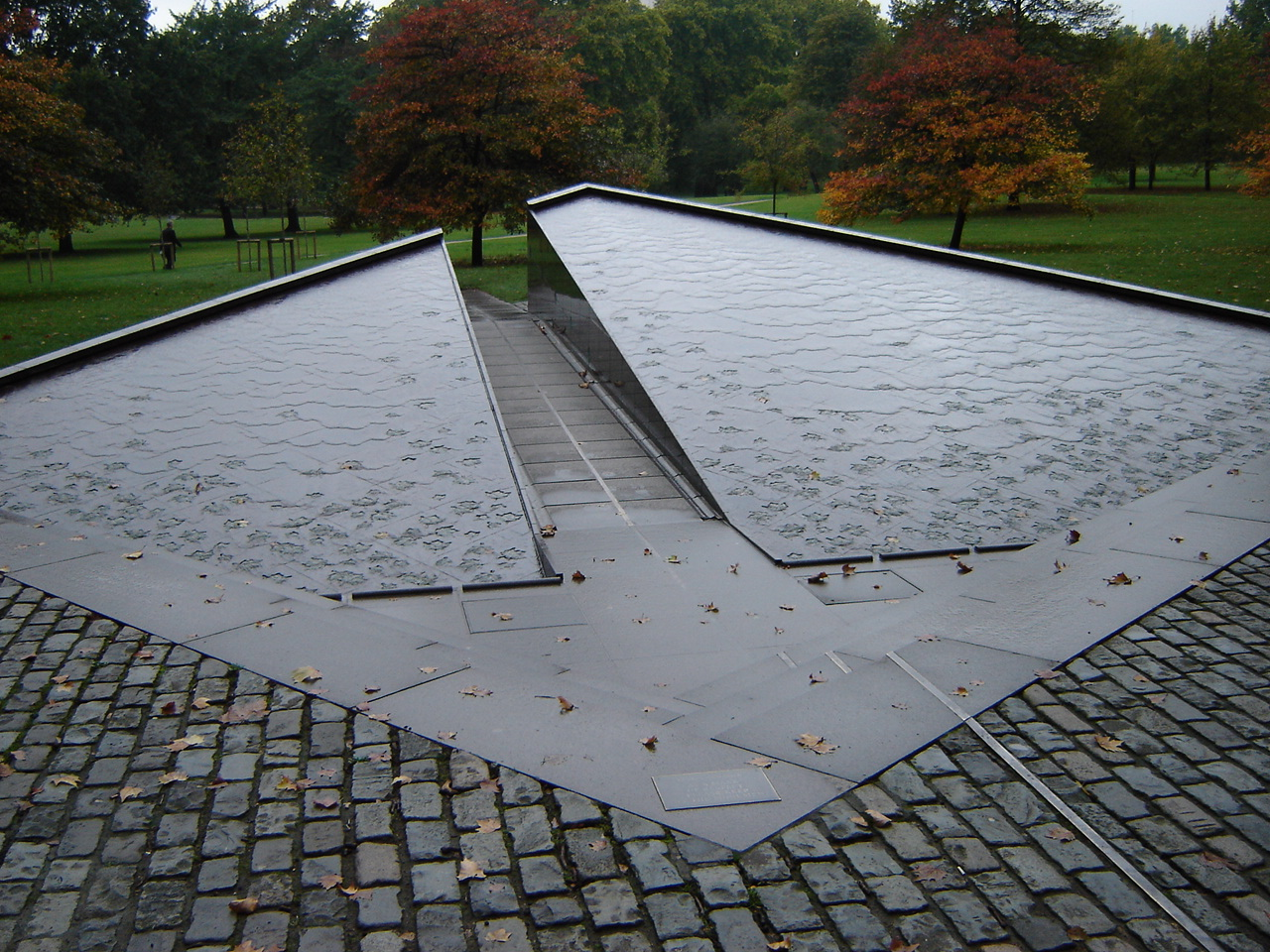
Canada Memorial in Green Park, London, near Buckingham Palace pays tribute to the Canadians who participated in the two World Wars.

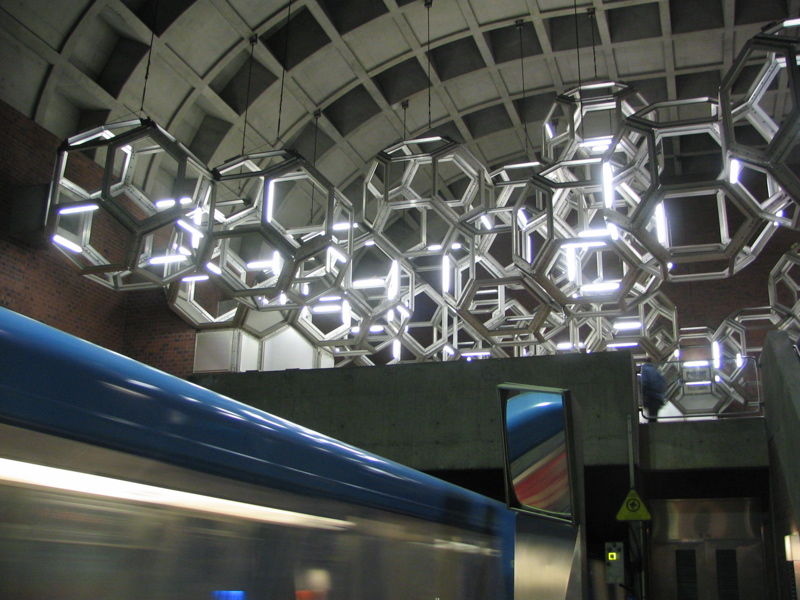
Pierre Granche's *Système, a huge suspended geometric system in Namur metro station, Montreal, Quebec

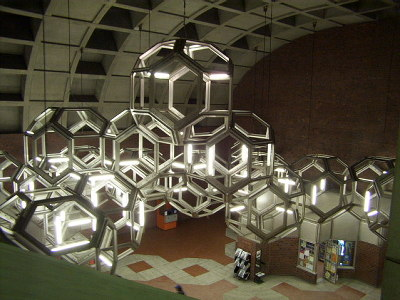
Pierre Granche's *Système, a huge suspended geometric system in Namur metro station, Montreal, Quebec

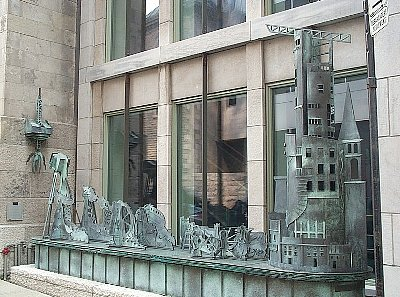
Pierre Granche's Totem urbain / histoire en dentelle, an allegorical representation of Montreal history, at the McCord Museum, Montreal;

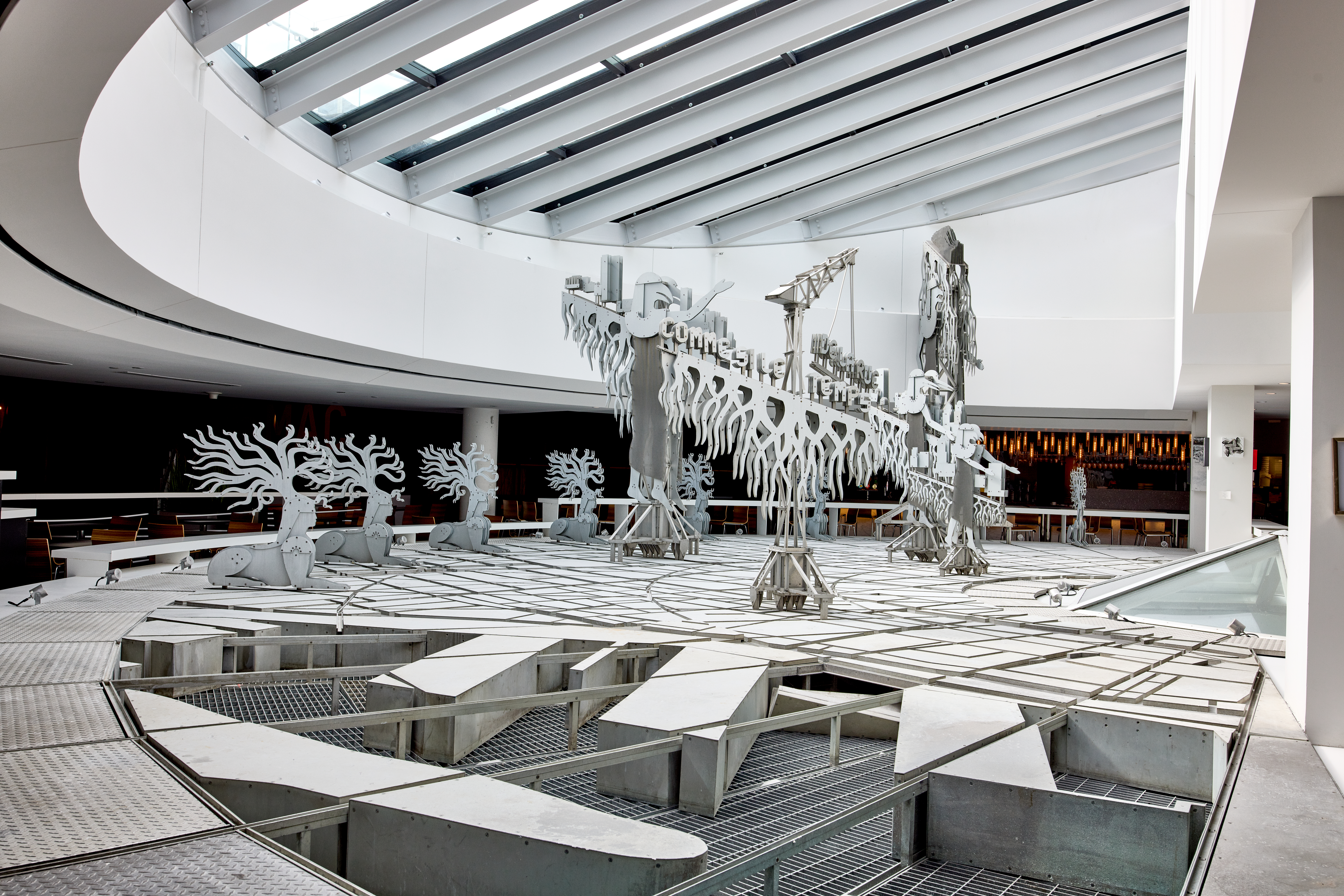
Pierre Granche's Comme si le temps... de la rue, an ensemble of symbolic aluminium free-standing sculptures in a large fountain basin visible from the exterior and interior of Place des Arts, Montreal, Quebec

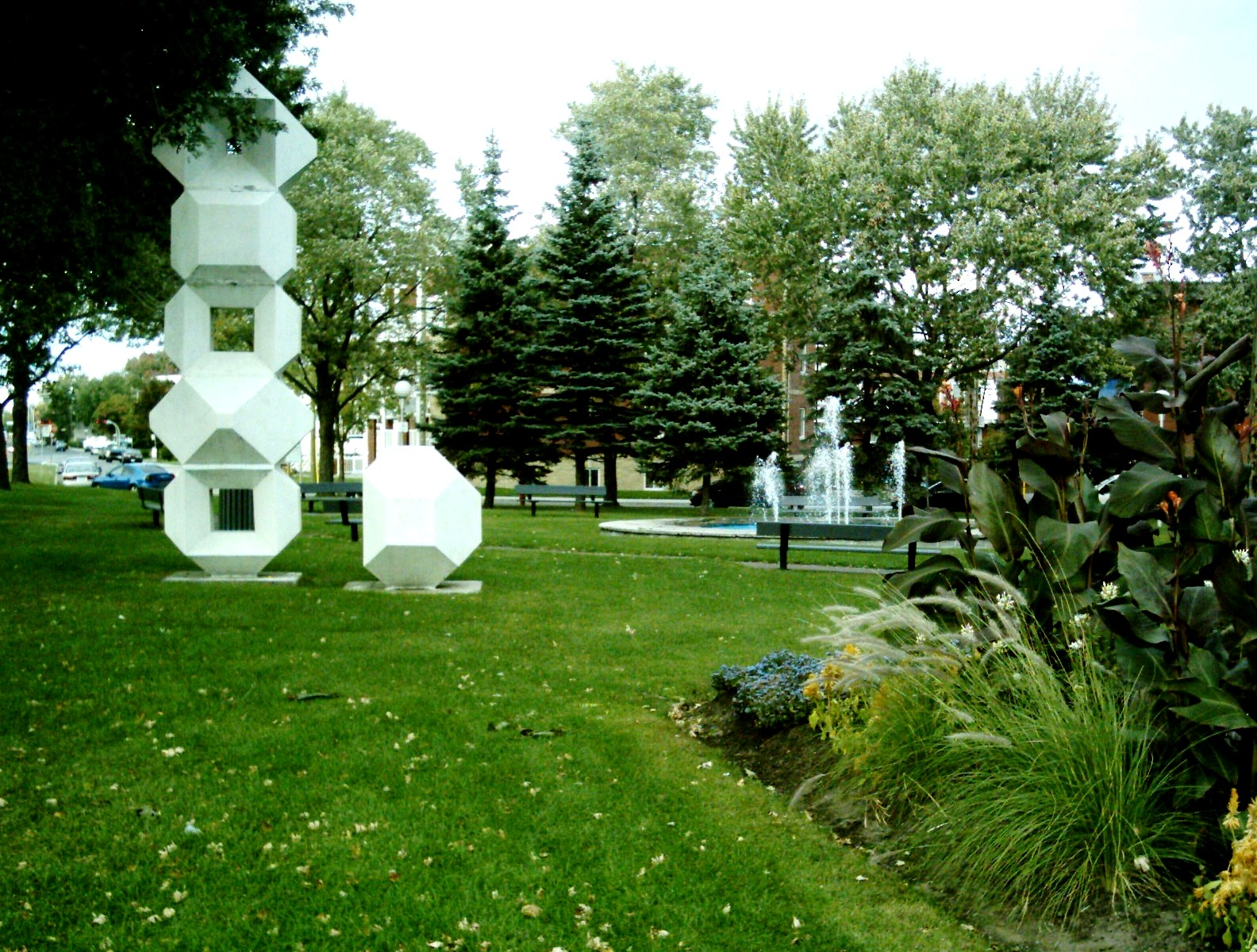
Pierre Granche's sculpture, Parc de Montréal-Nord à l'intersection des boulevards Henri-Bourassa et Léger
- 32 fois passera, le dernier s'envolera, a collection of vertical glass screens with plant forms in aluminum, symbolising education, in the courtyard of the Pavillon J-A-de Sève, UQAM, Montreal;
- Lieu re-découvert, an environmental intervention of a variety of truncated pyramid shapes, Le Gardeur hospital, Repentigny, Quebec;
- Égalité / équivalence, a grouping of sculptures representing dogs, winged men, and gardens, Université Laval, Quebec City;

See List of Canadians, List of Quebecois.
