= Constitution Hill, London =

Historic road in the City of Westminster

Coordinates: 51.5024°N 0.1464°W

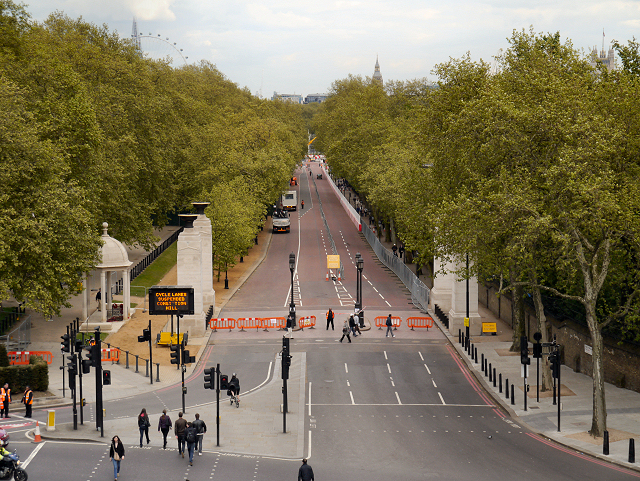
Constitution Hill from Wellington Arch, with the Memorial Gates visible (2012)

Constitution Hill is a road in the City of Westminster. It connects the western end of The Mall (just in front of Buckingham Palace) with Hyde Park Corner, and is bordered by Buckingham Palace Gardens to the south, and Green Park to the north. At the top of the rise in the roadway at the Corner is the Wellington Arch, near where the road is flanked by the Memorial Gates war monument.

== Name ==
The origin of the name is uncertain. Parliamentary records from 1642 show a reference to "a small redoubt and battery on Constitution Hill". One theory is that King Charles II and others had a habit of taking "constitutional" walks (a stroll to benefit health, a persons 'constitution') there. In Strype's Map, 1720, it is marked "Road to Kensington". (The roadway leads from the areas of St James's and Buckingham palaces to the area of Kensington Palace.) In John Smith's map of 1724, it is called "Constitution Hill".

An old lane on this route was widened in connection with the development of Buckingham Palace in the 1820s by John Nash. It formed a processional route from the palace to Hyde Park Corner and the Park. It is now closed to traffic on Sundays and public holidays.

== History ==
One account has Charles' brother, James, Duke of York returning from a hunt on Hounslow Heath and stopping his coach along Constitution Hill to avoid hitting the king walking across the road. Upon wondering if Charles put himself in danger by walking out in front of a vehicle, the King replied, "No danger whatever, James, for I am sure that no man in England would take my life to make you king."

Constitution Hill was a popular spot for duels. On 11 January 1696, Sir Henry Colt, 1st Baronet was challenged to a duel by Robert "Beau" Fielding (future husband of Charles II's mistress Barbara Palmer, 1st Duchess of Cleveland), near what is now the site of Bridgewater House. Fielding injured the Baronet, but was subsequently disarmed, ending the fight. In 1730, William Pulteney, 1st Earl of Bath duelled with John Hervey, 2nd Baron Hervey.

The area was the scene of three assassination attempts on Queen Victoria—in 1840 (by Edward Oxford), 1842 (by John Francis) and 1849 (by William Hamilton). In 1850, the former Conservative Prime Minister Sir Robert Peel was thrown from his horse on Constitution Hill by the gate into Green Park; he suffered a fatal injury and died three days later.

Black cabs on Constitution Hill, with the wall of Buckingham Palace Gardens on the left (2026)

Wellington Arch at Hyde Park Corner sits at the end of the road by Apsley House. It was designed by Decimus Burton and completed in 1828. A major restoration project by English Heritage was undertaken between 1999 and 2001. In 2002, war memorial to over five million Commonwealth soldiers, including India, Pakistan, Bangladesh, Sri Lanka, Africa, Caribbean and Nepal, was constructed near the top of Constitution Hill, just before Hyde Park Corner; the memorial is known as the Memorial Gates. It was opened by Queen Elizabeth II on 6 November.

Large concrete lamp posts were installed in Constitution Hill in the 1960s. Thanks to the swift intervention of comedian and enthusiastic environmentalist Spike Milligan they were removed within days and the old gas lamps are still there.

== Notes ==
Citations

Sources

- Wheatley, Henry Benjamin (1891). London Past and Present: Its History, Associations, and Traditions.
- Weinreb, Ben; Hibbert, Christopher; Keay, John; Keay, Julia, eds. (2008) [1983]. The London Encyclopaedia (Third ed.). Macmillan. ISBN 978-1-405-04924-5.
