= William Hales Hingston =

Canadian politician

The Honourable Sir William Hales Hingston KCB
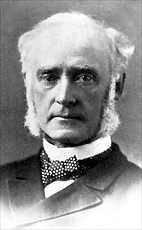

16th Mayor of Montreal
- In office 1875–1877
- Preceded by: Aldis Bernard
- Succeeded by: Jean-Louis Beaudry

Senator for Rougemont
- In office 1896–1907
- Preceded by: William Henry Chaffers
- Succeeded by: Georges-Casimir Dessaulles

Personal details
- Born: 29 June 1829 Hinchinbrooke, Lower Canada
- Died: 19 February 1907 (aged 77) Montreal, Quebec, Canada
- Profession: Physician, surgeon

Sir William Hales Hingston KCB (29 June 1829 – 19 February 1907) was a Canadian physician, politician, banker, and Senator.

== Early life and education ==
William Hingston was born on 29 June 1829, in Hinchinbrooke near Huntingdon, Quebec, to Lieutenant-Colonel Samuel James Hingston and Eleanor McGrath. He studied medicine at McGill University, graduating MD, CM in 1851. The following year he travelled to Scotland to further his medical education. He enrolled in the Edinburgh Extramural School of Medicine at Surgeons' Hall where he studied under Sir James Y Simpson and James Syme, qualifying as Licentiate of the Royal College of Surgeons of Edinburgh (LRCS) in 1852. Hingston continued his medical training visiting medical centres in London, Dublin, Paris, Berlin, Heidelberg, and Vienna.

== Career ==
Returning to Montreal he was appointed professor of clinical surgery at the Hôtel-Dieu and later became chief of surgery. He carried out a nephrectomy for a renal tumour in 1863, thought to have been the first time this procedure was carried out in Canada. He resigned from the Hôtel-Dieu to in order to be a founder of Bishop’s College faculty of medicine in Montreal, becoming its first Dean and professor of surgery. In 1875 he became professor of surgery at the Montreal School of Medicine and Surgery and was appointed Dean of this school in 1887. Hingston was a founder-member of both the Montreal Medico-Chirurgical Society and the Canadian Medical Association, becoming president of the association and was later president of the College of Physicians and Surgeons of Quebec.

In 1875, Hingston became Mayor of Montreal and was re-elected by acclamation for a second and final term. During these terms he was able to promote legislation to improve the sanitation of the city. As a member of the Central Board of Health during the smallpox epidemic of 1885 he was a strong advocate of vaccination as a result of which his house was threatened by opponents of vaccination.

Hingston was president of the Montreal City and District Savings Bank (today the Laurentian Bank of Canada).

In 1896, Hingston was appointed to the Senate of Canada representing the senatorial division of Rougemont, Quebec. He sat as a Conservative and died in office.

== Honours and awards ==
Hingston was knighted by Queen Victoria in 1895. Pius IX made him a Knight Commander of the Order of St. Gregory the Great in 1875. Pope Leo XIII conferred on him the Cross "Pro Ecclesia et Pontifice".

== Death ==
Hingston died at Montreal on February 19, 1907, and was buried in Notre-Dame-des-Neiges cemetery.

== Family ==
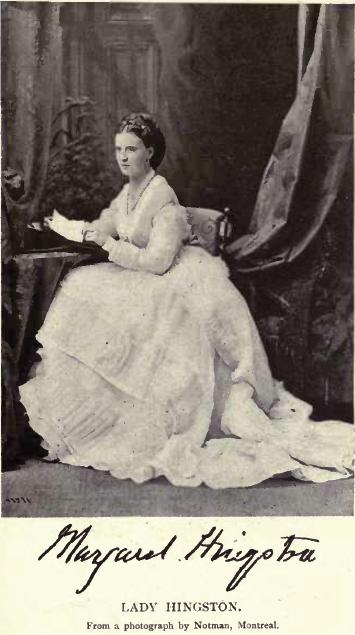
Lady Margaret Hingston by William Notman

He married Margaret Josephine Macdonald, the daughter of Donald Alexander Macdonald, and Catherine Fraser, at Toronto, Ontario 16 September 1875, Margaret was born at Alexandria, Ont., and educated in Montreal. Lady Hingston volunteered for the St. Patrick's Orphan Asylum and the Catholic Sailors' Club. She served as a director of the Women's Historical Society, and vice-president of the Aberdeen Association, Montreal. She was a founder and later President, of the Society of Decorative Art. She championed the preservation of Mount Royal Park, and served as a member of the advisory board of the Parks and Play-grounds Association. She was identified with the movement for the prevention of tuberculosis.

Their oldest son, William F. Hingston (1877–1964), was rector of Loyola College from 1918 to 1925.

== Gallery ==
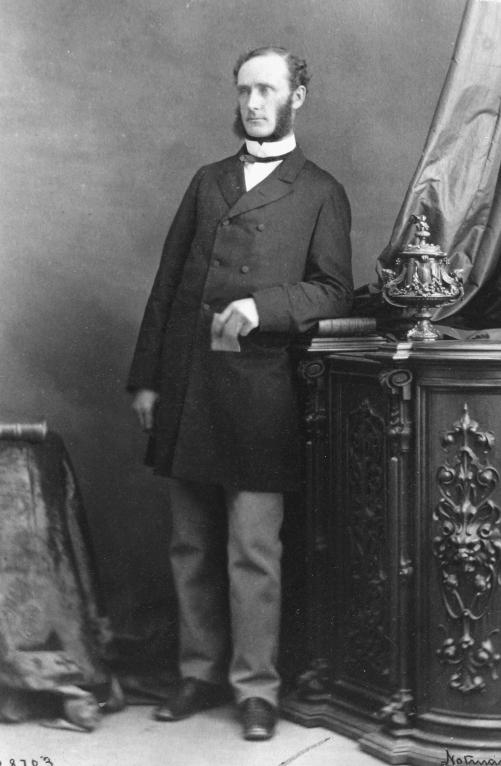
