= Canada Memorial =

War memorial in Green Park, London

- Canada
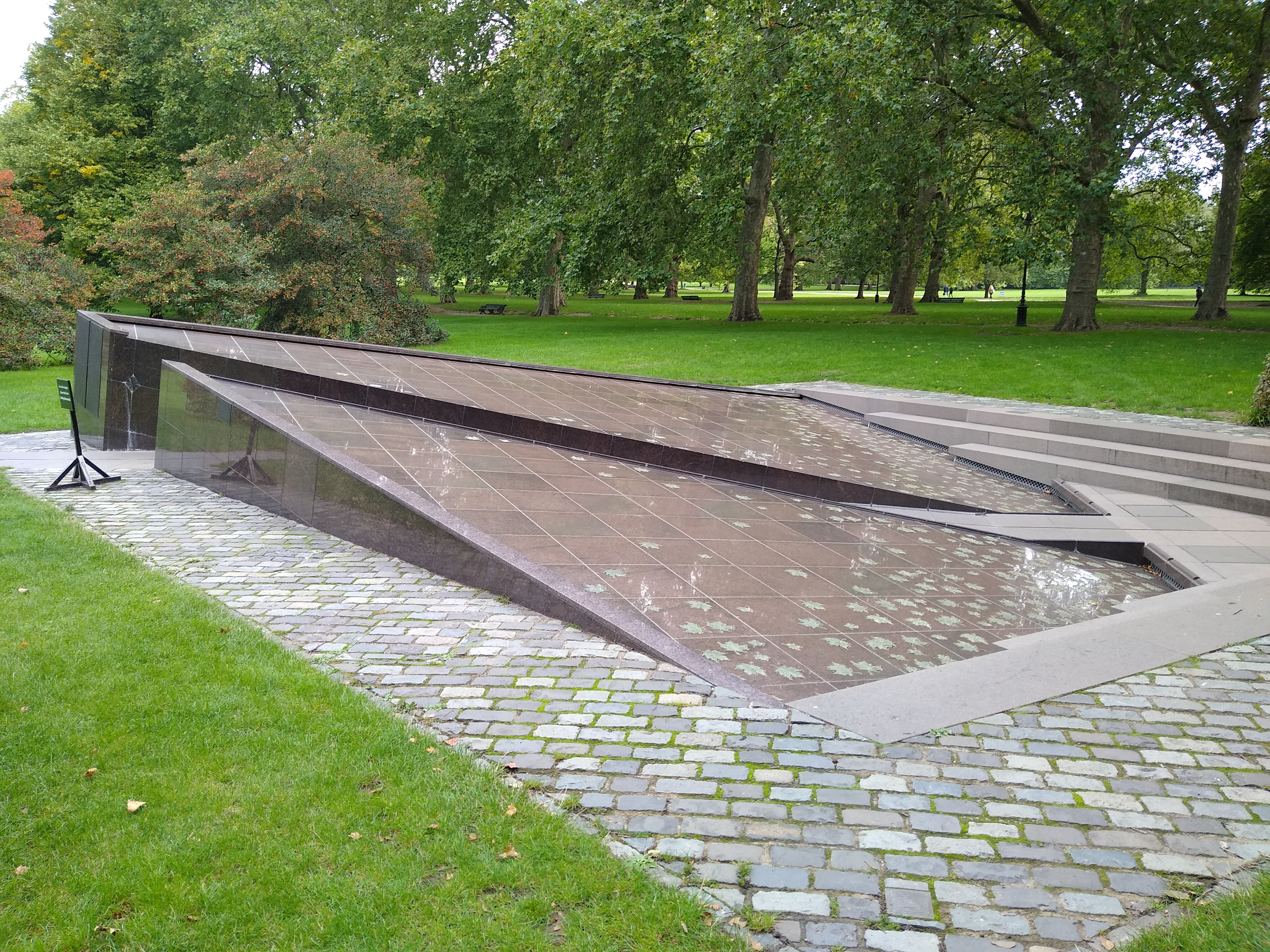
- Canada Memorial
- For 113,663 members of the Canadian Forces killed during the First and Second World Wars.
- Unveiled: 1994; 32 years ago
- Location: 51.5029°N 0.1426°W; London, SW1
- Designed by: Pierre Granche

The Canada Memorial in Green Park, London, United Kingdom, commemorates members of the Canadian Forces killed during the First and Second World Wars. It was designed by the Canadian sculptor Pierre Granche, erected in 1992 and unveiled by Queen Elizabeth II in 1994. The memorial was the result of lobbying and fund raising, much of it in Canada, by the former Canadian media tycoon Conrad Black.

== History and description ==
Pierre Granche, one of Canada's foremost sculptors, won the commission as the result of a competition, sculpted the memorial from red granite; it is divided by a walkway into two distinct halves, representing Britain and Canada's joint participation in World Wars I and II. The inclined sculpture is inset with 506 bronze maple leaves (the Canadian emblem) and the country's coat of arms. Water flows across the sloping surface and creates an illusion of floating leaves. An inscription at the centre of the memorial reads:

"In two world wars one million Canadians came to Britain and joined the fight for freedom. From danger shared, our friendship prospers."

From 2004, following a change in fortunes of the memorial's patron, Conrad Black, the memorial fell into disrepair and became subject to debate concerning its maintenance. In 2008, the Canadian Government assumed responsibility for the upkeep of the memorial: announcing "Our Government will ensure that the Canada Memorial in London, England, has the long-term care and upkeep it deserves as a lasting and fitting tribute to our nation's truest heroes." For a period in October 2011, the memorial was fenced off and not operational, despite £50,000 spent by Veterans Affairs Canada in renovations and upkeep. After refurbishment of corroded pipes and fittings, the memorial has now reopened.

== Canada Memorial Foundation ==
At the same time as the Memorial was being built and unveiled, the same group of people behind it raised an endowment called the Canada Memorial Foundation. Since the early 1990s that endowment has been sending British students to do post-graduate studies at Canadian universities. It is managed by volunteer trustees and is completely separate from the Green Park Memorial. However, the Foundation shares similar aims of encouraging the connections and cooperation between Britain and Canada.

== See also ==
- Canada Gate
- Canadian war memorials
