= Giovanni Battista Borea d'Olmo =

Italian politician

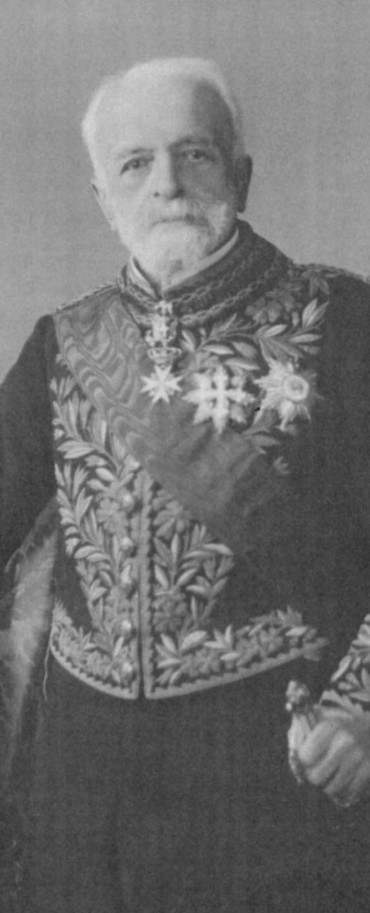
- Born: 11 October 1831; Genoa, Kingdom of Sardinia
- Died: 19 October 1936 (aged 105); Sanremo, Kingdom of Italy
- Occupations: Nobleman and politician

Giovanni Battista Borea d'Olmo was born in Genoa, Kingdom of Sardinia on 11 October 1831 and died in Sanremo the 19 October 1936 at 105 years. He was a member of Italian Senate from 18 November 1922 to his death.
