= Green Park =

Royal park in London, England

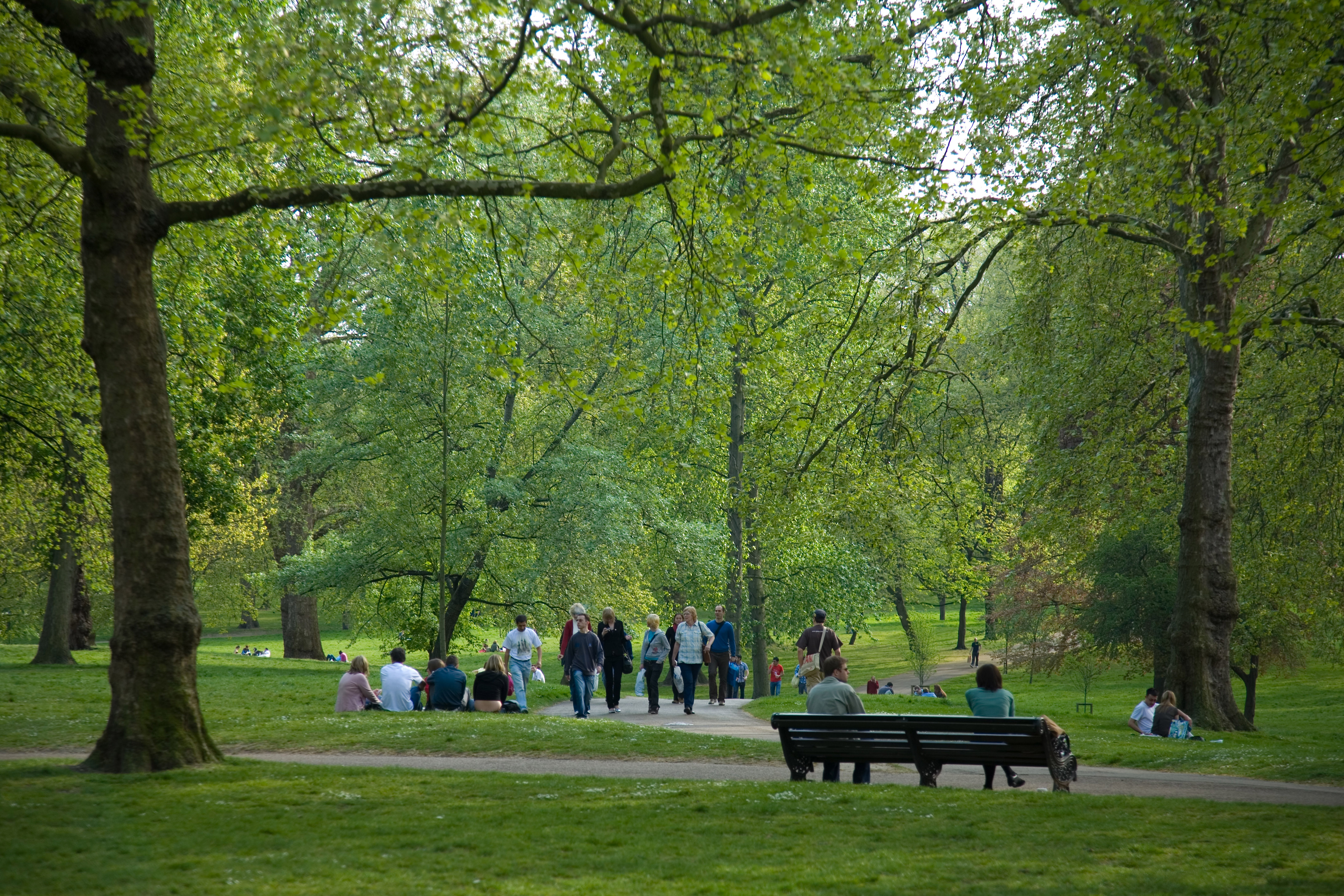
- The park in 2007

- Location within Greater London
- Type: Public park
- Location: London, SW1; United Kingdom
- Coordinates: 51°30′15″N 0°08′37″W
- Area: 19 hectares (47 acres)
- Operator: The Royal Parks
- Public transit: Green Park
- Website: www.royalparks.org.uk/parks/green-park

The Green Park, one of the Royal Parks of London, is in the City of Westminster, Central London. Green Park is to the north of the gardens and semi-circular forecourt of Buckingham Palace, across Constitution Hill road. The park is in the middle of a near-continuous chain of green spaces in Westminster that includes St James's Park, Hyde Park, and Kensington Gardens. To the northeast of Green Park is the district of St James's including, Lancaster House, Clarence House, and St James's Palace.

First enclosed in the 17th century by King Charles II, it was landscaped in 1820 and is notable among central London parks for having no lakes or buildings, and only minimal flower planting in the form of naturalised narcissus.

== Description and surroundings ==
Green Park covers just over 40 acres (16 ha) between Hyde Park and St. James's Park. Together with Kensington Gardens and the gardens of Buckingham Palace, these parks form an almost unbroken stretch of tended green land. This combined parkland is mostly bounded on the four cardinal compass points by Horse Guards Parade or adjoining Downing Street (east); the Victoria/Belgravia district (south); Kensington and Notting Hill (west) and St James's, Mayfair and Bayswater (north).

In contrast with its neighbouring parks, Green Park has no lakes, no buildings, no playgrounds and three, early yet distinctive post-war-era public monuments:

- The Canada Memorial by Pierre Granche
- The Diana of the Treetops Fountain by Estcourt J Clack, by the park's eponymous tube station
- The RAF Bomber Command Memorial by Philip Jackson in a hardscaped road apex (sometimes considered Hyde Park Corner, facing it).

The park consists almost entirely of mature trees rising out of turf; the only flowers are naturalised narcissus.

The park is bounded on the south by Constitution Hill, on the east by the pedestrian Queen's Walk, and on the north by Piccadilly. It meets St. James's Park at Queen's Gardens with the Victoria Memorial at its centre, opposite the entrance to Buckingham Palace. To the south is the ceremonial avenue of the Mall, and the buildings of St James's Palace and Clarence House overlook the park to the east. Green Park Underground station has platforms of the Piccadilly, Victoria and Jubilee lines. It is by the north end of Queen's Walk. The Tyburn stream runs beneath Green Park.

In 2016 one acre of the park near the Bomber Command Memorial was designated as the 90th Coronation Meadow, named The Queen's Meadow, and established as a wildflower meadow using seed taken from ancient meadows at Horsenden Meadow in Ealing, and Valebridge Common in West Sussex. In 2017 a wide range of flowers were reported such as yellow rattle and common poppy.

== History ==
The park is said to have in been for many medieval years a swampy burial ground for lepers from the hospital at St James's on its north side. It was first enclosed in the 16th century to be part of the estate of Poulteney family. It was then, as probably earlier too, partly excavated for the sand for the mortar for brickwork and stone building elements. In 1668, this part of "the Poulteney estate", the "Sandpit Field", was surrendered to Charles II, who made the bulk of the land into a Royal Park as "Upper St James's Park" and enclosed it with a brick wall. He laid out its main walks and built an icehouse to supply the household with ice for cooling drinks in summer.

In 1746, Upper St. James's Park was officially renamed The Green Park. The park was an open meadow with few flowers at the time but this state may arise from a feud between Charles II of England and his Queen Consort, Catherine of Braganza. The oral history says the Queen discovered Charles had picked flowers in the park for another woman. In revenge, the Queen ordered that every single flower in the park should be pulled up and no more planted.

The Queen's Walk was laid out for George II's queen Caroline; it led to the reservoir that held drinking water for St James's Palace, called the Queen's Basin.

Until a few decades later the park was on the outskirts of London; it was dark and somewhat semi-rural. It was known as a haunt of highwaymen and thieves. During the 18th and 19th centuries, it was a popular place for ballooning attempts and public firework displays; Handel's Music for the Royal Fireworks was composed specifically for a fireworks celebration held in The Green Park in 1749.

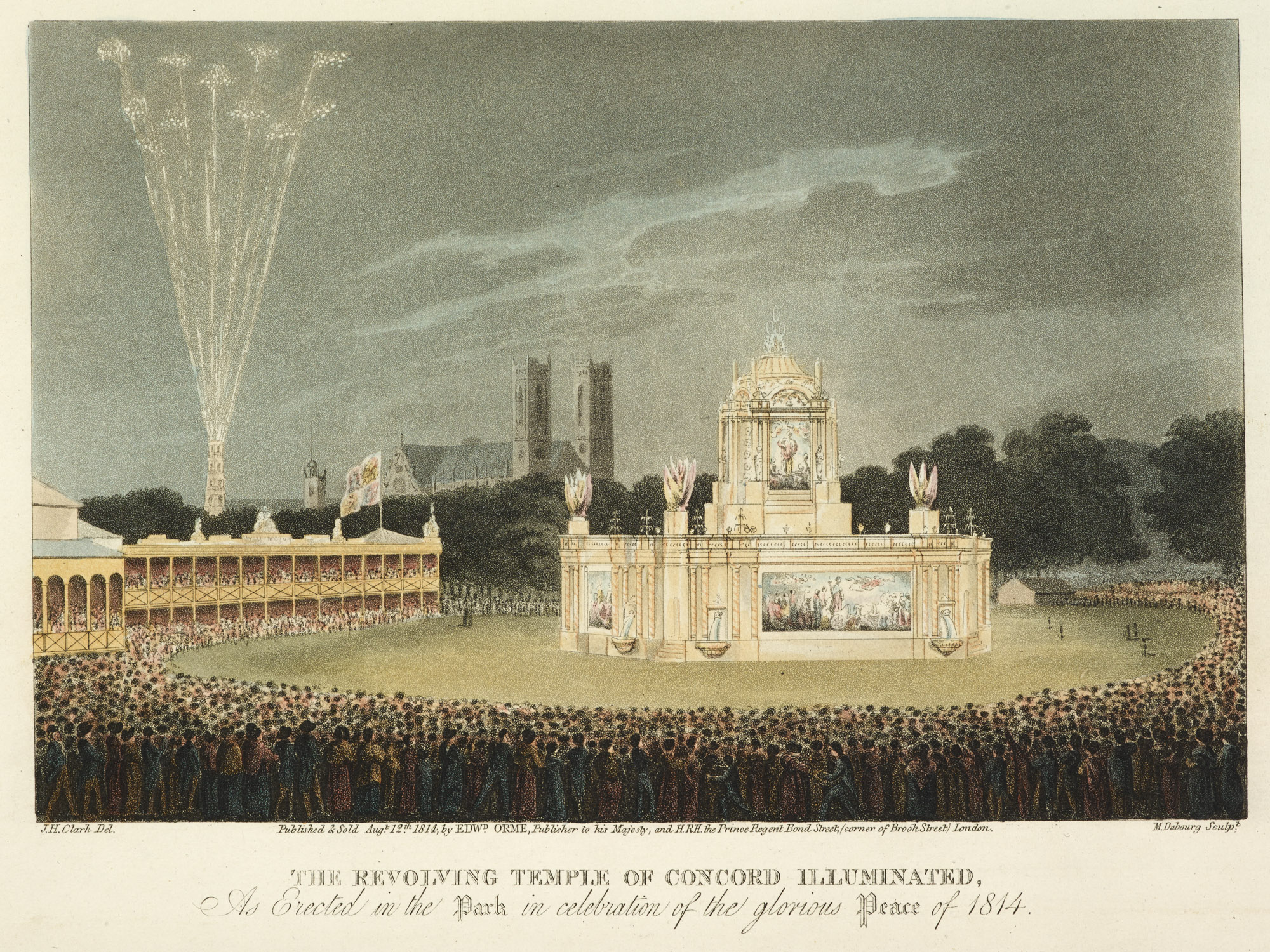
The revolving Temple of Concord illuminated, 1 August 1814

The park was also a principal venue for the Grand Jubilee of 1814 on 1 August, celebrating peace with France and the centenary of the Hanoverian succession. Sir William Congreve, Comptroller of the Royal Laboratory at Woolwich, designed a revolving Temple of Concord which was initially concealed within a mock Gothic castle; a staged siege with cavalry, artillery and rockets culminated in the castle walls collapsing to reveal the illuminated temple.

The park was also known as a duelling ground; one particularly notorious one being in 1730 between William Pulteney, 1st Earl of Bath and John Hervey, 1st Earl of Bristol.

In 1820, John Nash landscaped the park, as an adjunct to St James's Park. On 10 June 1840, it was the scene of Edward Oxford's assassination attempt on Queen Victoria, on Constitution Hill.

== Gallery ==
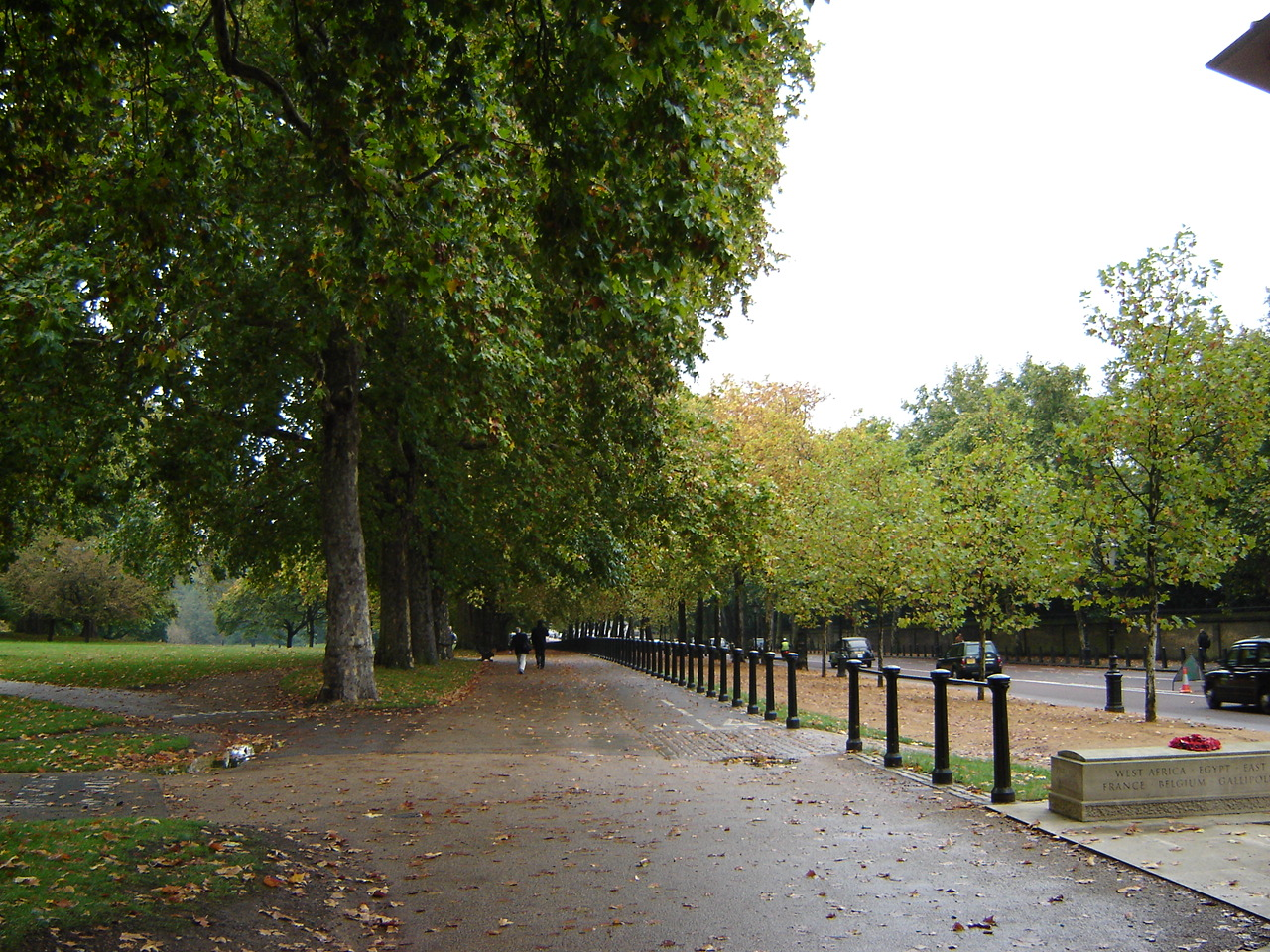
Green Park and Constitution Hill

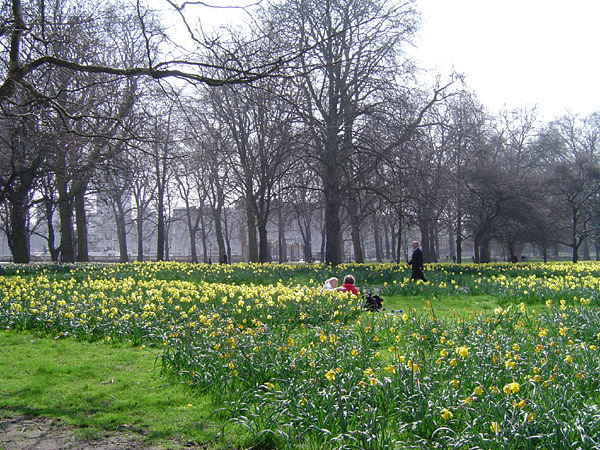
Green Park, London

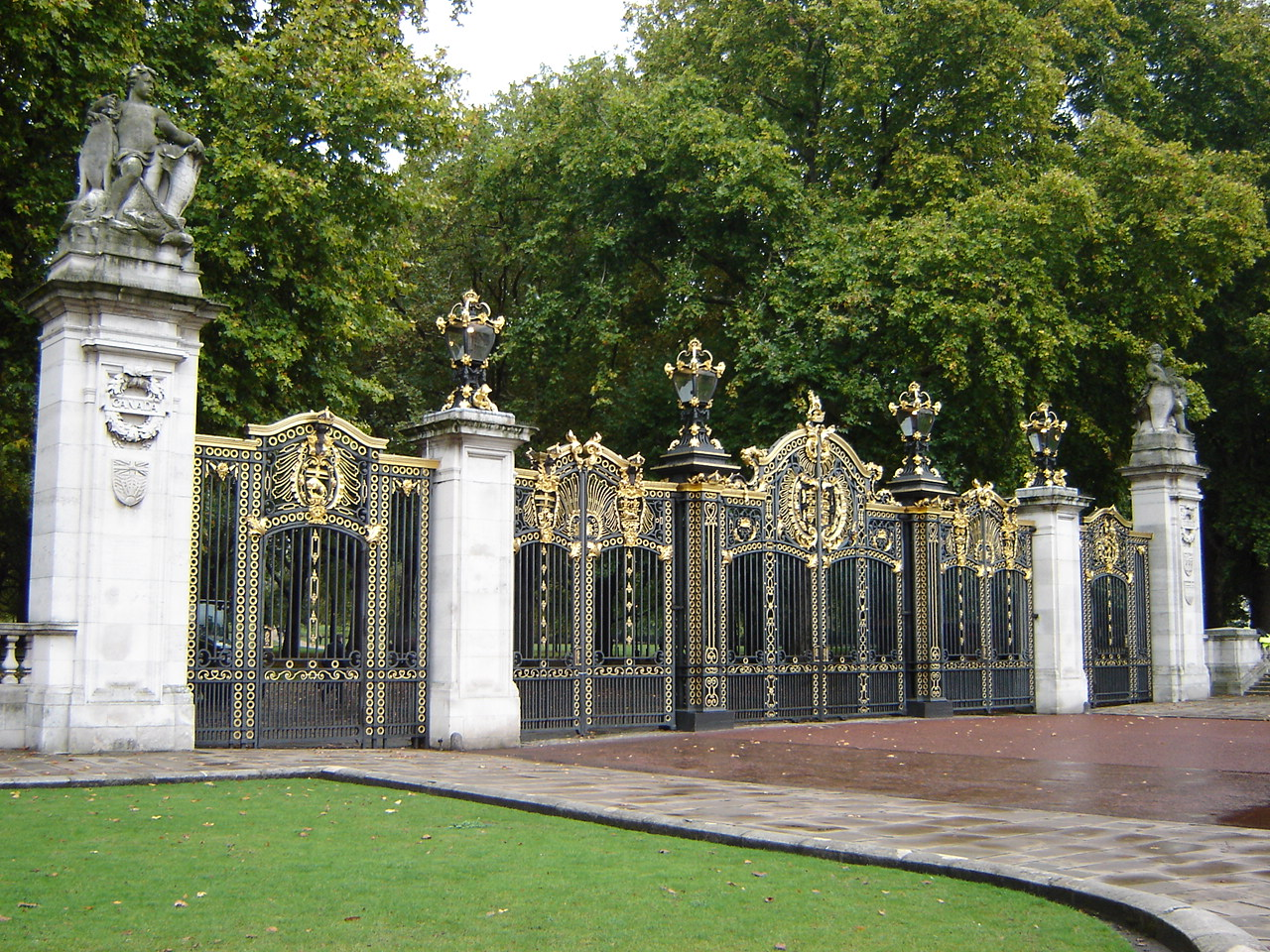
Canada Gate on the south side of the park

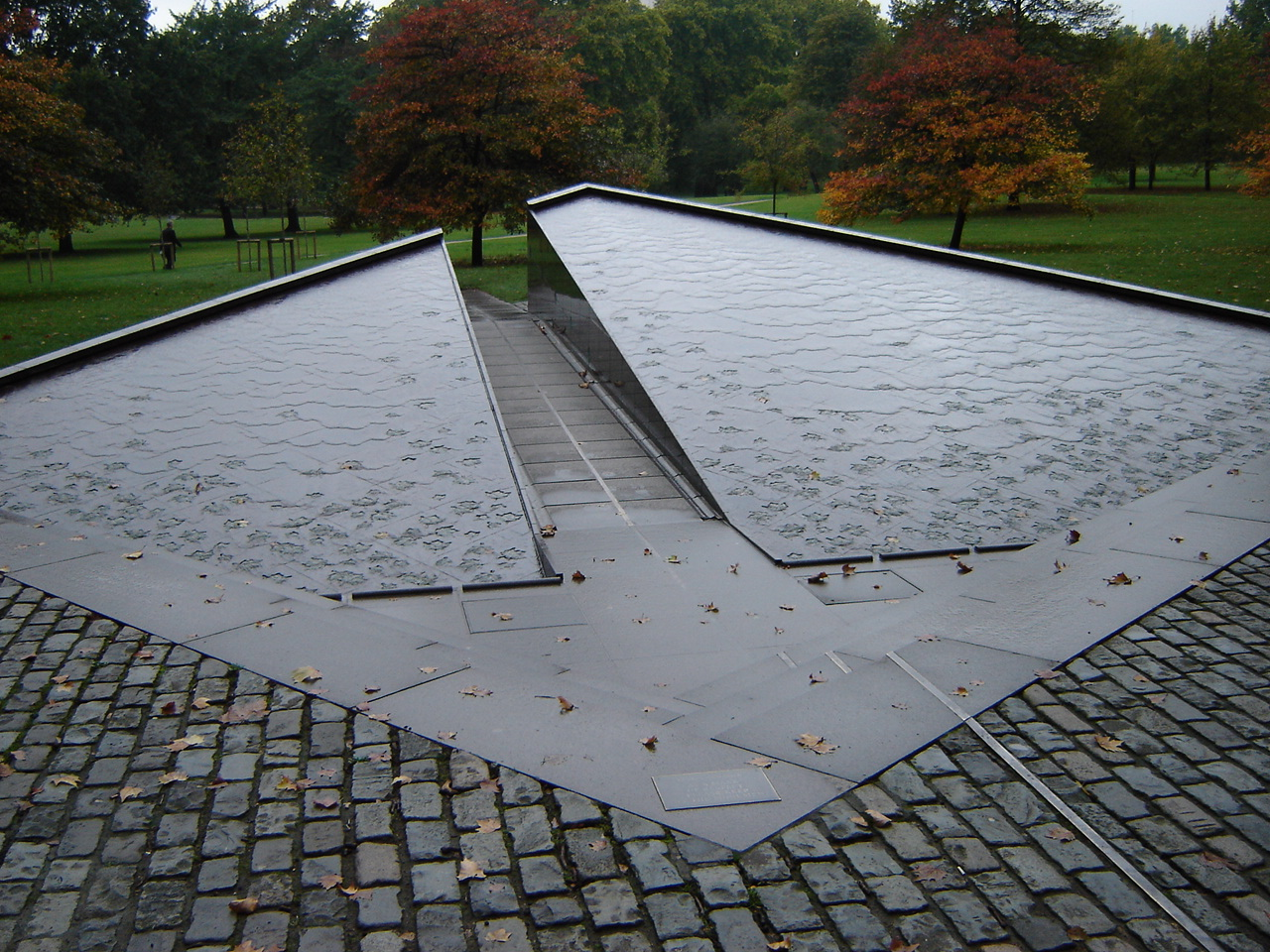
Pierre Granche's Canada Memorial in Green Park, London, near Buckingham Palace

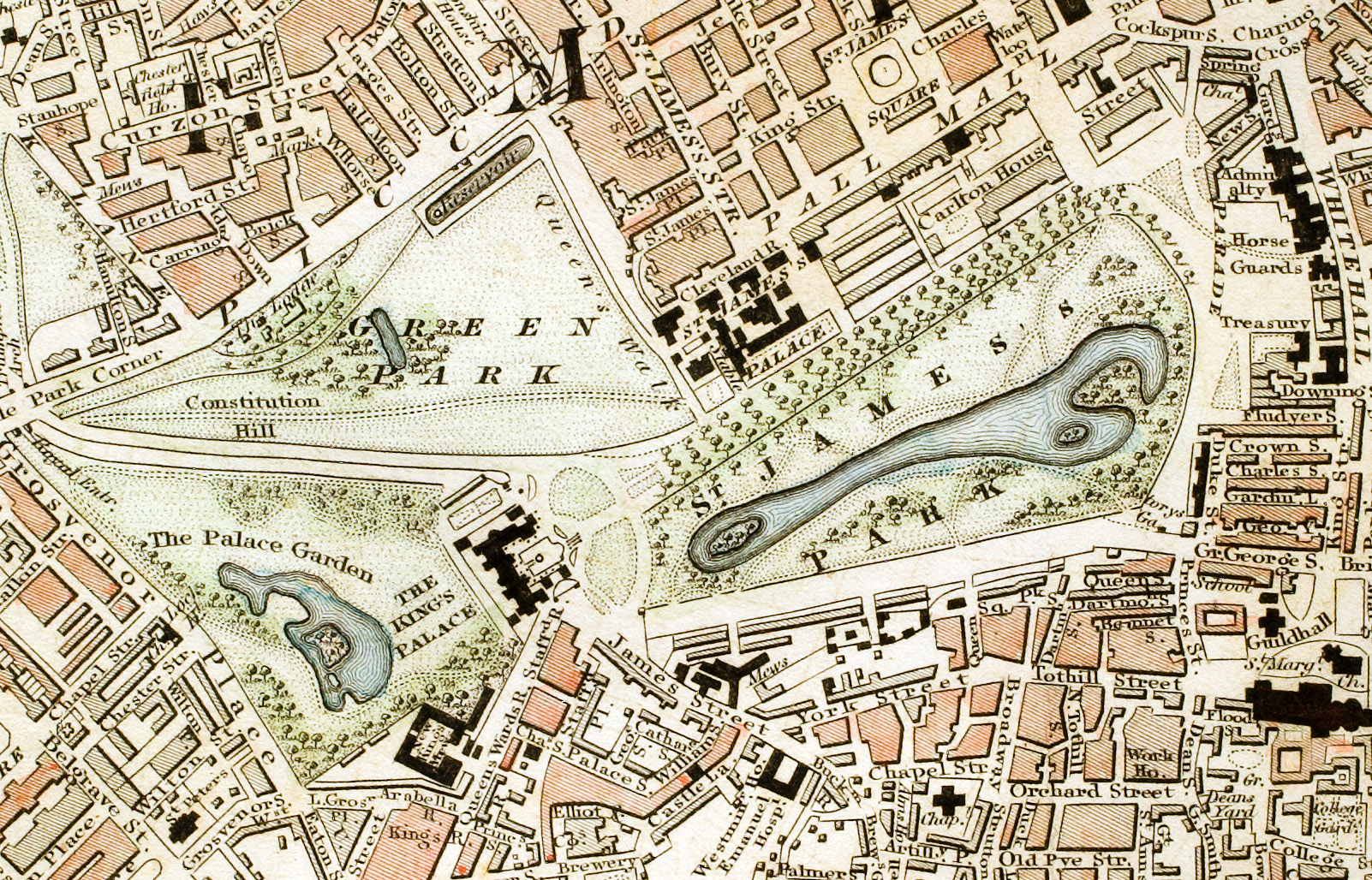
Green Park and St. James's Park c.1833

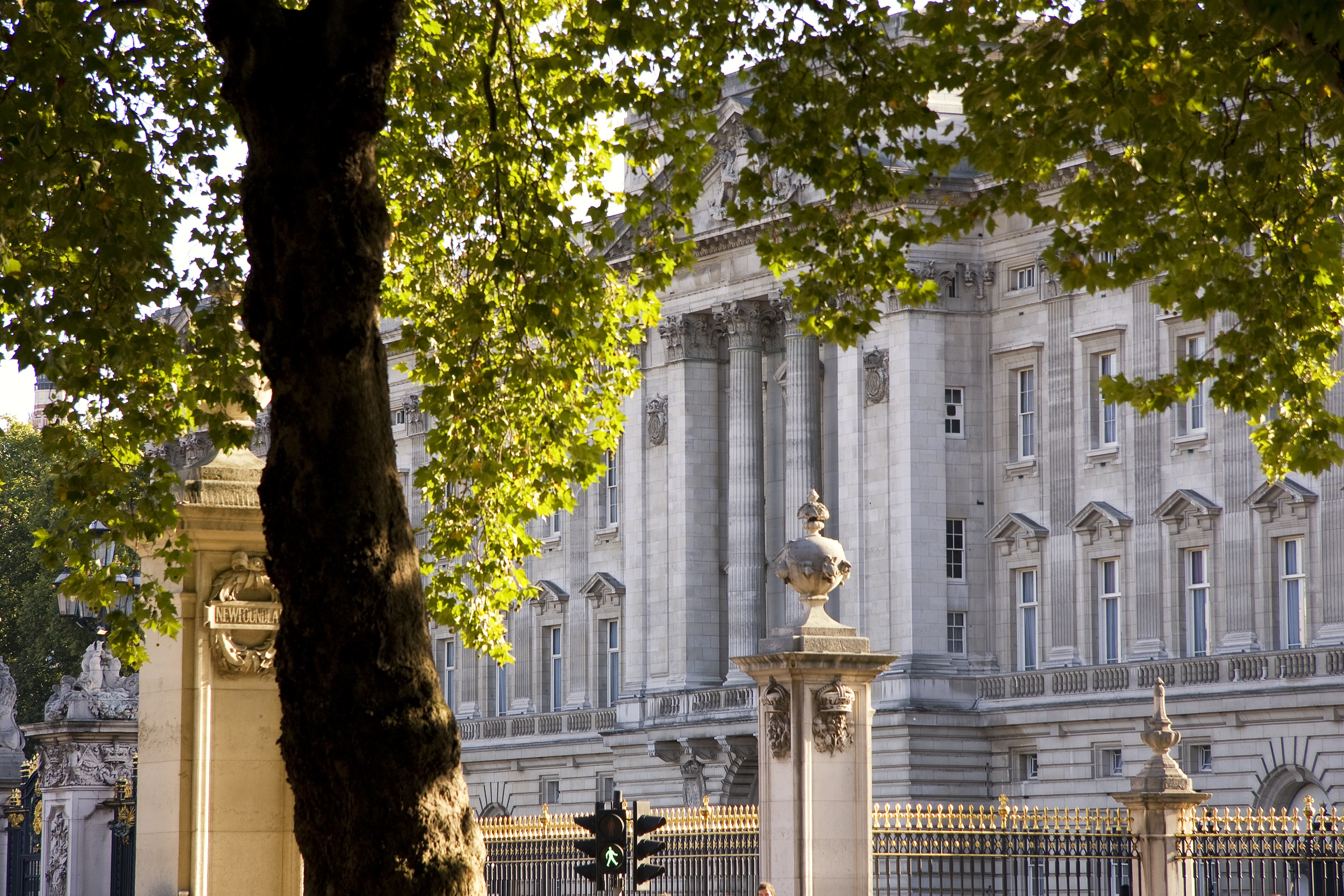
Buckingham Palace, as seen from Green Park
