= Henriette Dessaulles =

Canadian writer, diarist and journalist (1860-1946)

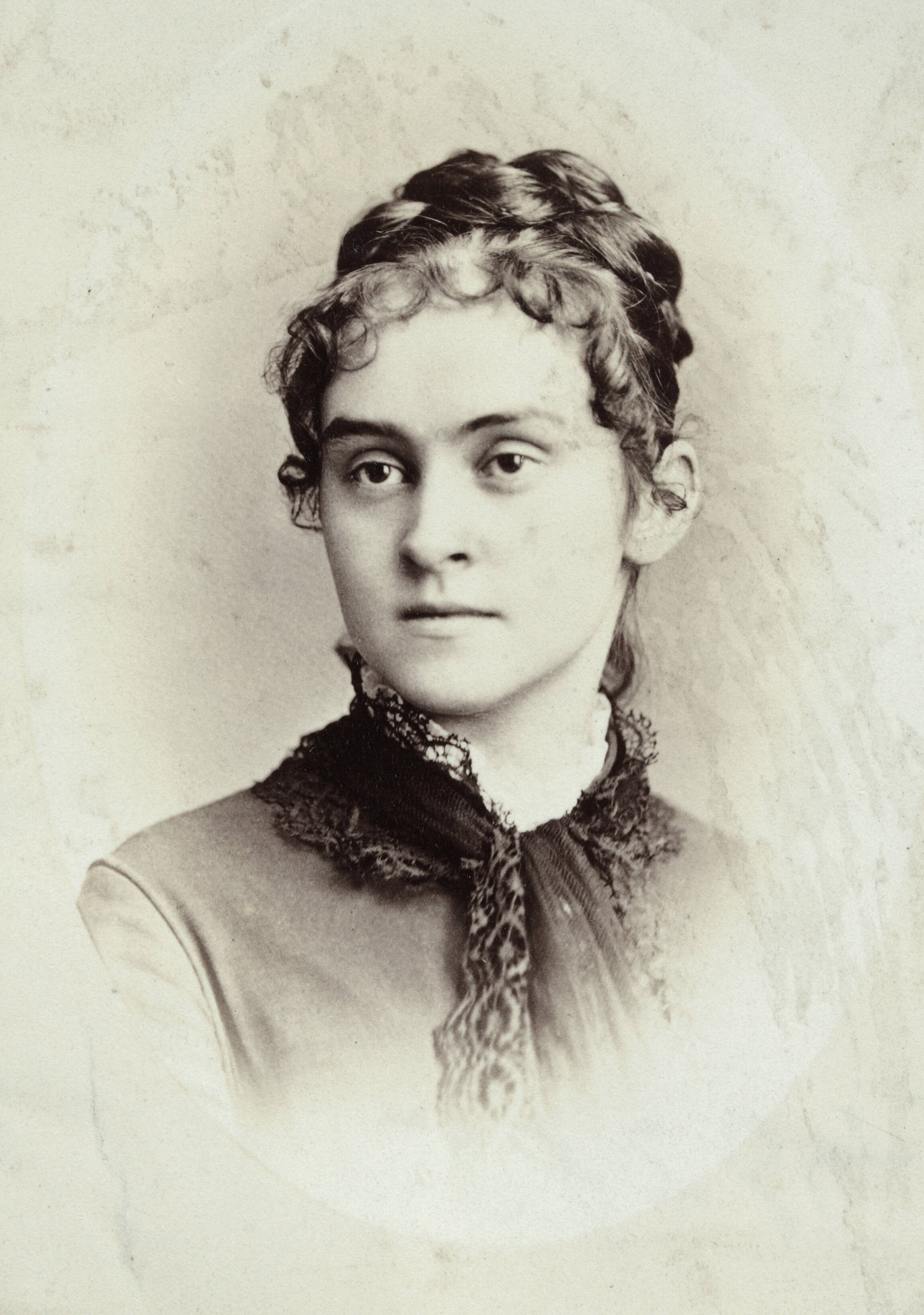
- Born: February 6, 1860; Saint-Hyacinthe, Canada East
- Died: November 17, 1946 (aged 86); Montreal, Quebec, Canada
- Occupations: Diarist, columnist, journalist
- Writing career
- Notable works: Hopes and Dreams, The Diary of Henriette Dessaulles 1874-1881

Henriette Dessaulles (February 6, 1860 – November 17, 1946), also known by the pen name Fadette, was a Canadian journalist and diarist from Quebec. An important pioneer of women's writing in Quebec, she is best known for her longtime column in Le Devoir and for her childhood diaries which were posthumously published in 1971.

She was born in Saint-Hyacinthe, Quebec to Georges-Casimir Dessaulles, at the time the town's mayor and later a member of the Legislative Assembly of Quebec and the Senate of Canada, and Émilie Mondelet. Jean Dessaulles was her paternal grandfather, Dominique Mondelet was her maternal grandfather, and Louis-Joseph Papineau was her godfather.

From 1874, when aged 14, Dessaulles began writing a diary while being educated at convent school. She continued until 1881, when she married Maurice St-Jacques, with whom she went on to have seven children before his death in 1897. At the time of St-Jacques' death, he was a Quebec Liberal Party candidate for the electoral district of Saint-Hyacinthe in the 1897 provincial election; Dessaulles' father was nominated in his place, and won the seat.

== Journalism ==
After St-Jacques' death, Dessaulles began writing a column for La Patrie under the pseudonym Jean Deshayes. She also wrote for Le Journal de Françoise, Le Courrier de Montmagny, La Revue de la femme, La Revue moderne, Le Canada and Le Nationaliste before joining Le Devoir in 1910. For Le Devoir, she wrote a long-running column under the pen name Fadette. Compilations of her Fadette columns were published as Lettres de Fadette in 1914, 1915, 1916 and 1918. Dessaulles also published several works of children's literature, including Les Contes de la lune (1932), and Il etait une fois (1933).

She continued writing the column in Le Devoir until the 1940s, and died November 17, 1946.

== Diaries ==
Her childhood diaries were published in 1971 as Fadette: Journal d'Henriette Dessaulles 1874–1881. They attracted widespread attention, as both a portrait of the thoughts of a young girl and as social history.

An English translation of the diaries by Liedewy Hawke was published in 1986 as Hopes and Dreams, The Diary of Henriette Dessaulles 1874–1881. Hawke won both the John Glassco Translation Prize and the Canada Council Translation Prize for her work.
