= Louis-Antoine Dessaulles =

Canadian seigneur, journalist and politician (1818-1895)

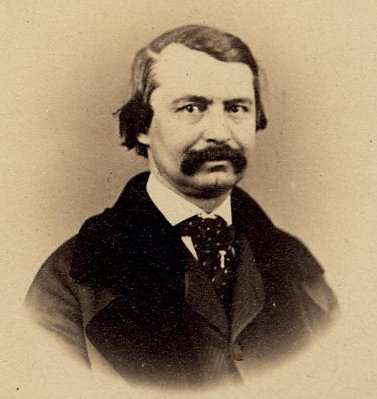
Louis-Antoine Dessaulles

Louis-Antoine Dessaulles (1818 – August 4, 1895) was a Quebec seigneur, journalist and political figure.

He was born in Saint-Hyacinthe, Lower Canada in 1818, the son of Jean Dessaulles, and studied at the Collège de Saint-Hyacinthe and the Petit Séminaire de Montréal. He studied law at Montreal, staying there with his uncle, Louis-Joseph Papineau; he helped Papineau escape from Montreal in November 1837. He travelled with Papineau's wife to Paris in 1839.

In 1835, Dessaulles had inherited the seigneury of Saint-Hyacinthe from his father. In 1844, he ran unsuccessfully against Thomas Boutillier to represent Saint-Hyacinthe in the legislative assembly. In 1847, Dessaulles began writing articles for the newspaper L'Avenir; he supported Papineau, opposed the political power of the Roman Catholic Church in Canada East, opposed the union of Upper and Lower Canada and supported annexation with the United States. He was mayor of Saint-Hyacinthe from 1849 to 1857. Dessaulles was editor for the Montreal paper Le Pays in its early days during the 1850s and again in 1861. In 1856, he was elected to the Legislative Council of the Province of Canada for Rougemont division. He spoke in favour of a decentralized federation. Dessaulles served several terms as president of the Institut canadien de Montréal. In 1863, he was appointed clerk of the crown and clerk of the peace; at that time, he resigned his seat on the legislative council and his editorship of Le Pays.

In financial difficulties, Dessaulles was forced to sell his property in 1867 and, in 1875, he fled to the United States and then to Belgium. It was discovered after his departure that he had been diverting funds collected while performing his duties as clerk. He moved to Paris in 1878 and died there in 1895; he was buried in the Cimetière de Pantin.

His brother Georges-Casimir was also mayor of Saint-Hyacinthe and served in the Quebec legislative assembly and the Senate of Canada.

== Works ==
- Papineau et Nelson : blanc et noir... et la lumière fut faite, 1848 (online)
- Six lectures sur l'annexion du Canada aux États-Unis, 1851 (online)
- Galilée, ses travaux scientifiques et sa condamnation : lecture publique faite devant l'Institut canadien, 1856
- À Messieurs les électeurs de la division de Rougemont, 1858
- Discours sur l'Institut canadien prononcé par l'Hon. L.A. Dessaules, président de l'Institut, à la séance du 23 décembre 1862, à l'occasion du dix-huitième anniversaire de sa fondation, 1863
- La Guerre américaine, son origine et ses vraies causes : lecture publique faite à l'Institut canadien, le 14 décembre 1864 (1864)
- A Sa Grandeur Monseigneur Charles Larocque, évêque de St. Hyacinthe, 1868
- Discours sur la tolérance, 1868 (excerpts)
- Dernière correspondance entre S.E. le cardinal Barnabo et l'Hon. M. Dessaulles, 1871
- La Grande guerre ecclésiastique : la comédie infernale et les noces d'or : la suprématie ecclésiastique sur l'ordre temporel, 1873
- Examen critique de la soi-disant réfutation de la Grande guerre ecclésiastique de l'Honorable L.A. Dessaulles, 1873
- Les erreurs de l'Église en droit naturel et canonique sur le mariage et le divorce, 1894
