= Le Canada (newspaper) =

Defunct Canadian newspaper

Le Canada is a Montreal daily newspaper which appeared from April 4, 1903 to November 7, 1954. Organ of the Liberal Party of Canada, it was directed from its creation until Christmas 1909 by Godfroy Langlois, who had to resign because of his anticlerical positions. Fernand Rinfret succeeded him and adopted a more moderate position, following the official position of the party. From 1930 to 1934, the newspaper was directed by Olivar Asselin, who imposed on his journalists a very demanding vision of the profession. Edmond Turcotte succeeds him. After the Second World War, the newspaper failed to adapt to the evolution of its readership and disappeared on November 7, 1954.

The circulation was 9,800 copies in 1903, 18,000 in 1905 and 15,200 in 1940.

== Collaborators ==
- Adolphe Nantel
- Edmond Chassé
- Edmond Turcotte
- Jean-Louis Gagnon
- Jean-Marie Nadeau
- Jules Fournier
- Olivar Asselin
- Pierre Laporte (à partir de 1942)
- Robert Élie
- Valdombre (Claude-Henri Grignon)
- Willie Chevalier

== Sources ==
- Dutil, P. A. (Summer 1993). "The Politics of Muzzling "Lucifer's Representative": Godfroy Langlois's Test of Wilfrid Laurier's Liberalism, 1892-1910". Journal of Canadian Studies/Revue d'Études Canadiennes (28–2). Peterborough, Ont.: 113–139. Dutil.
