= Georges-Casimir Dessaulles =

Canadian politician

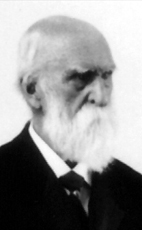
- Georges-Casimir Dessaulles

Senator for Rougemont senate division
- In office March 12, 1907 – April 19, 1930
- Appointed by: Wilfrid Laurier
- Preceded by: William Hales Hingston
- Succeeded by: Rodolphe Lemieux

Personal details
- Born: September 27, 1827 Saint-Hyacinthe, Lower Canada
- Died: April 19, 1930 (aged 102) Saint-Hyacinthe, Quebec
- Party: Liberal Party of Canada
- Relations: Jean Dessaulles (Father)
- Occupation: Businessman

Georges-Casimir Dessaulles (September 29, 1827 – April 19, 1930), was a Canadian businessman, statesman and senator. Dessaulles was one of the oldest serving politicians ever, only surpassed by Giovanni Battista Borea d'Olmo. Appointed to the Senate of Canada representing the Province of Quebec in 1907 at age 80, Dessaulles served for 23 years before dying at age 102.

Dessaulles was born in Saint-Hyacinthe, Lower Canada in 1827, the son of Jean Dessaulles and a nephew of Louis-Joseph Papineau. Dessaulles attended college at Georgetown University where he was a member of the Philodemic Society, graduating in 1848. Before becoming senator, Dessaulles was president of the Bank of Saint-Hyacinthe, and mayor of Saint-Hyacinthe. He also represented Saint-Hyacinthe in the Legislative Assembly of Quebec from 1897 to 1900. He was a last-minute candidate for the provincial seat, having been nominated after the death of the previous candidate, his son-in-law Maurice St-Jacques.

In 1857, he had married Émilie-Emma, the daughter of judge Dominique Mondelet; in 1869, he married Louise-Frances Leman after the death of his first wife. His 100th birthday was marked as a historic moment in the senate, because Dessaulles had become only the second sitting senator to reach the age of 100 (the other being David Wark). At his death in 1930, Dessaulles was the oldest sitting politician in the world. To date, no one has beaten this record.

Dessaulles is also renowned for only having spoken twice while serving as a Senator. Once to deny that his appointment was part of a corrupt bargain, and a second time to thank his fellow senators for his portrait, on his 100th birthday.

His daughter Henriette Dessaulles became a noted writer and journalist.
