= Papineau (surname) =

Papineau is a surname. Notable people with the surname include:

- Joseph Papineau, 19th-century Quebec politician
- Louis-Joseph Papineau, son of Joseph Papineau, also a 19th-century Quebec politician; headed the 1837 rebellions against the British government in Canada
- Amédée Papineau, son of Louis Joseph Papineau
- Denis-Benjamin Papineau, son of Joseph Papineau, was a Joint Premier of the Province of Canada
- Talbot Mercer Papineau, Rhodes scholar and soldier, died in the Great War
- David Papineau, British philosopher of mind and science
- Justin Papineau, Canadian ice hockey player
