= South and West Africa Gate =

- Crowds gathering outside Buckingham Palace with the north pier of South and West Africa Gate visible

General information
- Type: Gate
- Location: Queen Victoria Memorial scheme, London, United Kingdom
- Coordinates: 51°30′08″N 0°08′22″W
- Opened: 1911

Design and construction
- Architect: Sir Aston Webb

South and West Africa Gate is a memorial gate in London. Part of the larger Queen Victoria Memorial Scheme. It accompanies the Canada and Australia Gates outside Buckingham Palace together representing the contribution of the self-governing colonies to the memorial.

== History ==
In 1901, colonial governments were invited to make subscriptions to the memorial in return for sculptural representations on the scheme. Aston Webb, architect of the scheme, originally intended for a memorial more numerous in its figurative sculptures representing the colonies, something which became infeasible with a lack of funding. In 1901, he suggested to Montagu Ommanney of the Colonial Office that sculptural groups of the Dominions and Crown Colonies could be represented in sculptural groups on the gates and balustrades around the memorial. With assurances given by Joseph Chamberlain in 1901 that the representatives of the colonies could oversee the statuary to represent their contribution, a compromise was made for the self-governing colonies to be inscribed in the gate piers and the others, those being Newfoundland and Malaya, inscribed on the piers of supporting ball finials.

Thomas Brock, sculptor of the Victoria Memorial itself oversaw the preparation of the groups to the 1905 designs of Webb. The sculptures on the piers of the South and West Africa Gate were produced by Alfred Drury.

== Description ==
The South and West Africa Gate is the least elaborate of the gates, lacking any ironwork, but commands the most prominent position, serving as an entryway to The Mall from Buckingham Palace and the Victoria Memorial. The gates and railings are collectively Grade I listed.

The sculptures representing both South and West Africa are cherubs with European features. The pier on the north of The Mall is inscribed with South Africa, with the figure above holding a shield with arms of the Cape Colony, with an ostrich and monkey featured in the group. The southern pier inscribed with West Africa is topped with a similar boy holding a shield without any arms, an eagle and a lioness complete the group.

== See also ==
- Australia Gate
- Canada Gate
