= Alfred Drury =

British sculptor (1856–1944)

- Born: 11 November 1856; Islington, London
- Died: 24 December 1944 (aged 88); Lancaster Lodge, Wimbledon, London
- Education: Oxford School of Art; National Art Training School
- Known for: Sculpture

Edward Alfred Briscoe Drury RA (11 November 1856 – 24 December 1944) was a British architectural sculptor and artist active in the New Sculpture movement. During a long career Drury created a great number of decorative figures such as busts and statuettes plus larger monuments, war memorials, statues of royalty and architectural pieces. During the opening years of the 20th century he was among the foremost architectural sculptors active in Britain and in that period created the series of works in central London for which he is perhaps now best known. These include the figures on the Old War Office building in Whitehall, elements of the facade of the Victoria and Albert Museum and four of the colossal statues on Vauxhall Bridge.

== Biography ==
=== Education and training ===
Drury was born in Islington, London but raised in Oxford, where his father was a pub landlord. Drury studied at the Oxford School of Art and then at the National Art Training School in South Kensington, where his teachers included Jules Dalou and, later, Édouard Lantéri. Drury won gold medals in National Art Competitions in 1879, 1880 and 1881 before moving to Paris where he worked as an assistant to Dalou until 1885. While in Paris he assisted Dalou on the monumental Triumph of the Republic in the Place de la Nation.

When he returned to London, Drury worked as an assistant to the sculptor Joseph Edgar Boehm and began establishing himself as an independent artist. In 1885 Drury showed his first work at the Royal Academy, a terracotta copy of a sculpture by Dilou, The Triumph of Silenus. Also during 1885, he had pieces shown at exhibitions in both Paris and Brussels. While his early exhibition pieces, such as 1886s' The First Lesson, clearly showed the impact of his time in France, Drury soon became associated with the British New Sculpture movement. Both Circe, from 1895, and Griselda of 1896 were typical of the allegorical female figures from mythology and literature that were key subjects of the movement and both sculptures were reproduced in several different sizes in bronze and marble by Drury in subsequent years.

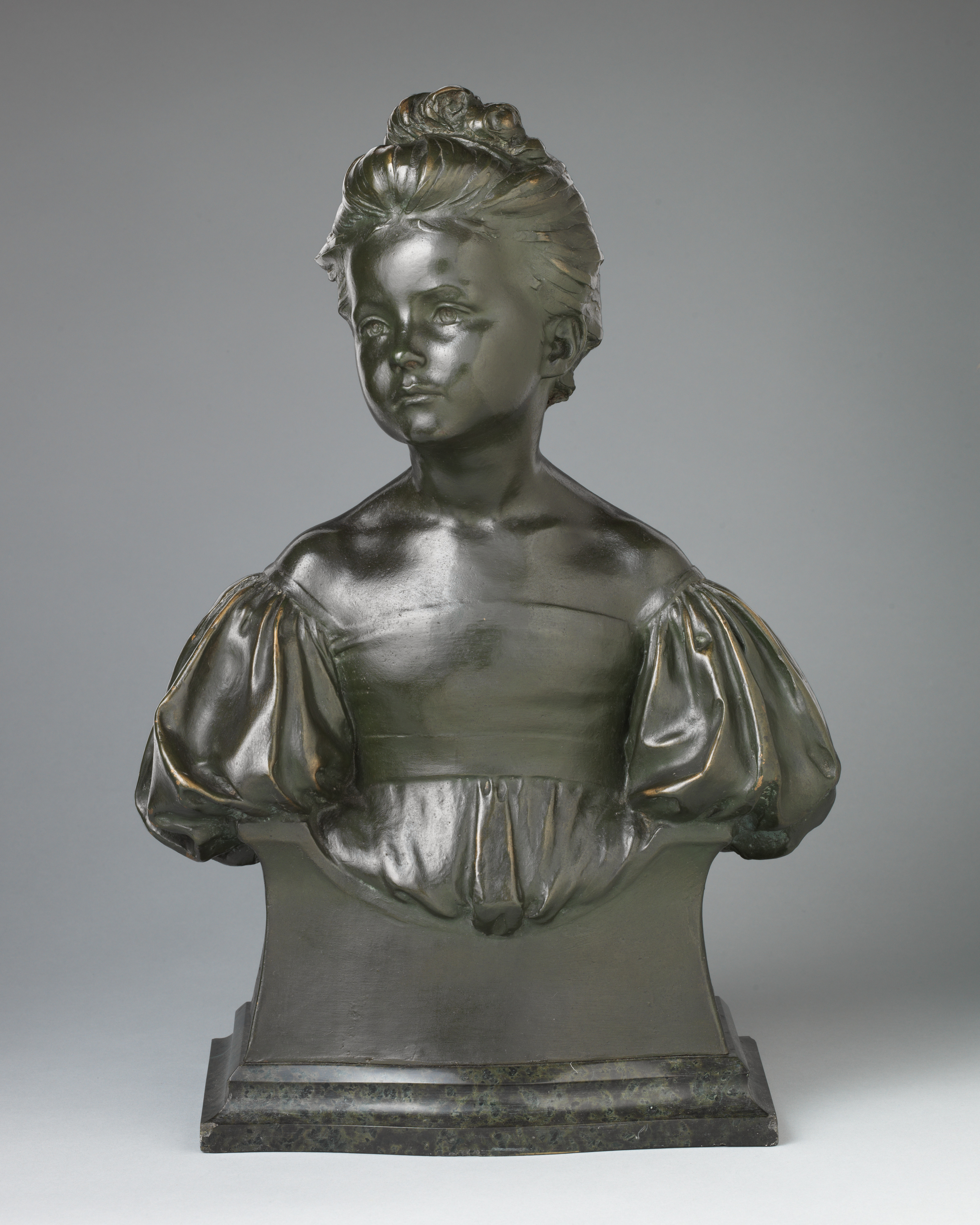
The Age of Innocence, c. 1900

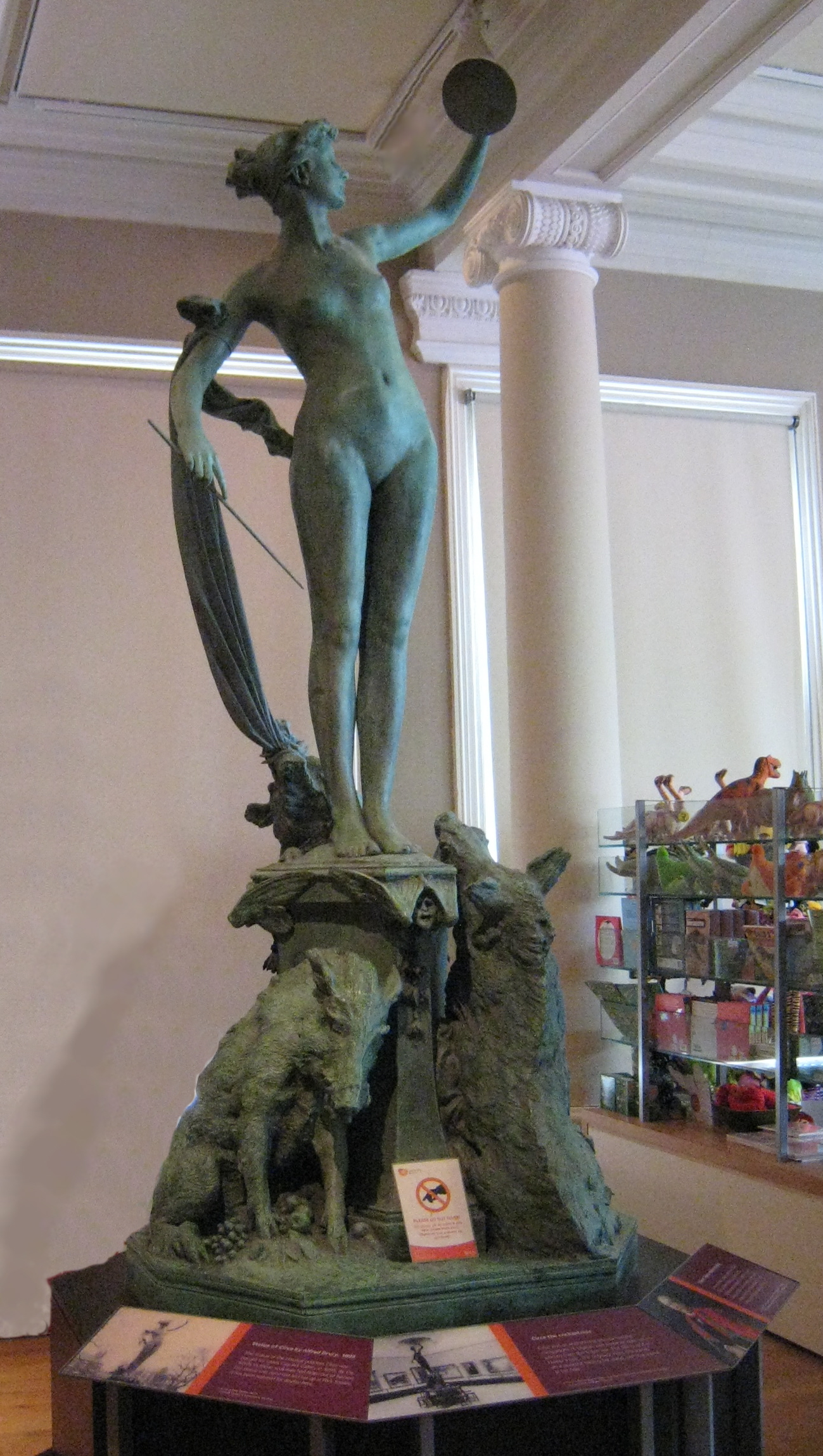
Life-size bronze version of Circe in Leeds City Museum

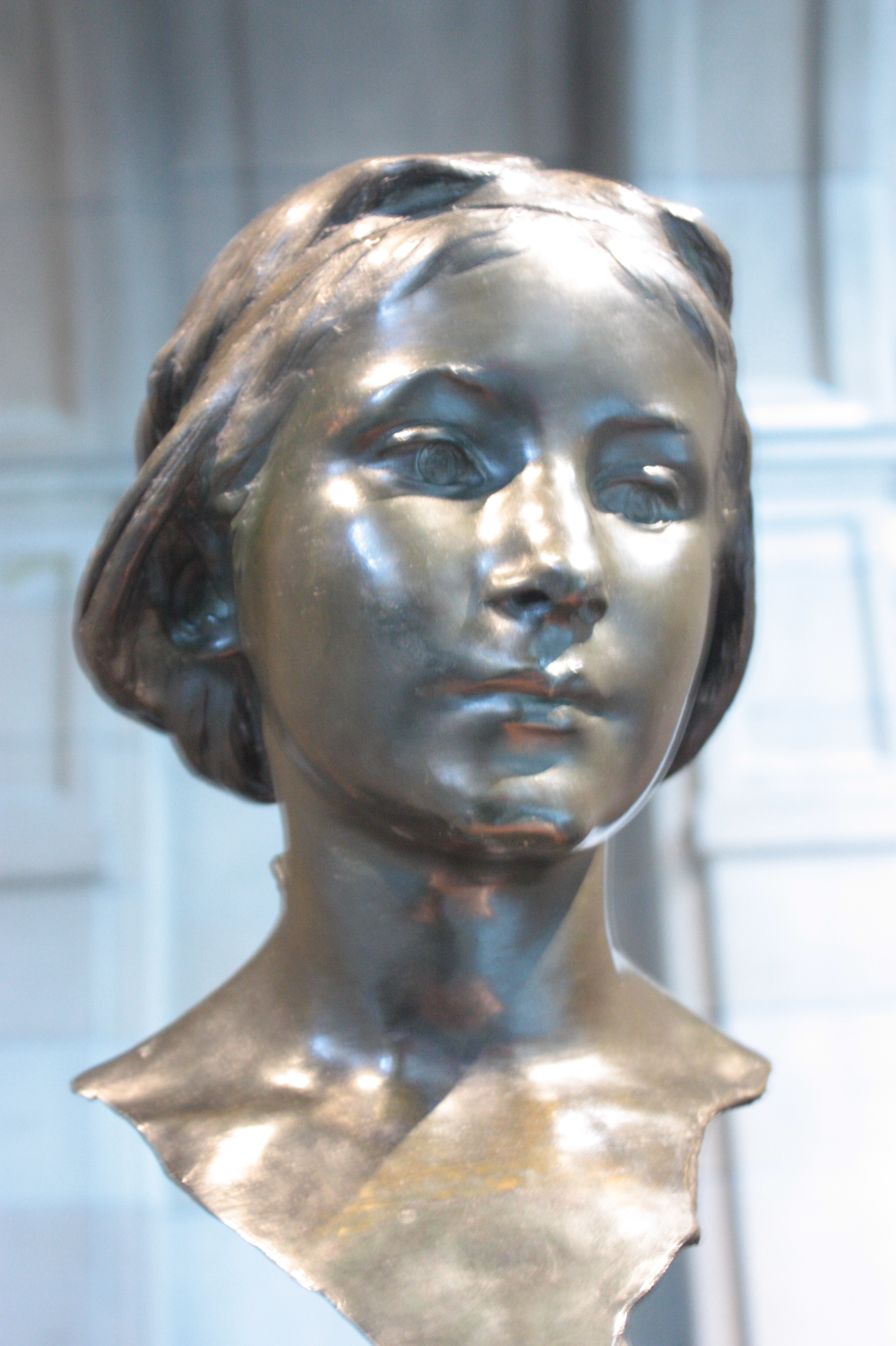
Griselda, c. 1897

=== Early commissions ===
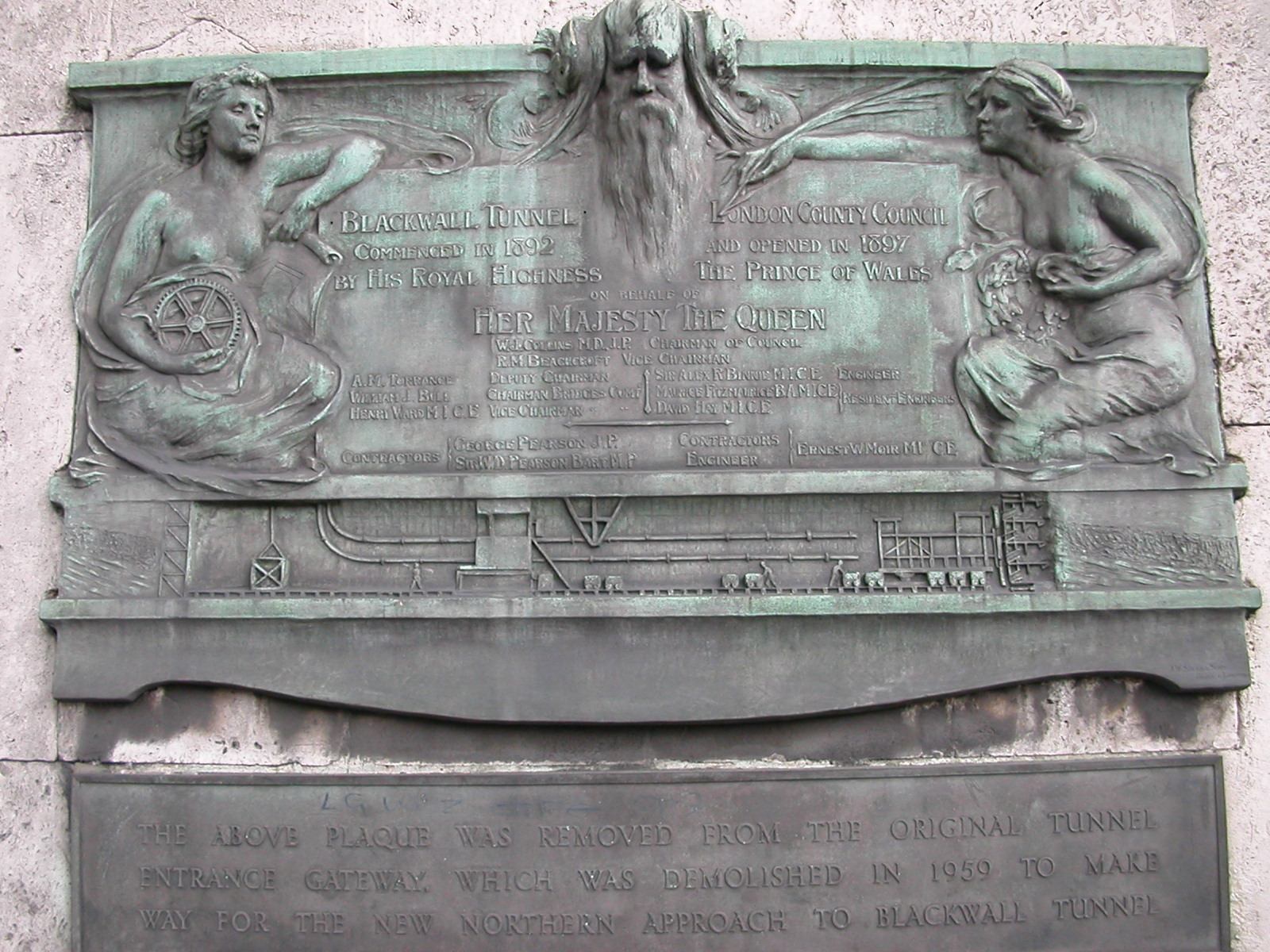
Blackwall Tunnel plaque (1897)

Alongside work on his exhibition pieces, Drury also began undertaking architectural commissions. In 1897, for example, he created a set of terracotta spandrels, representing Art and Design, for a coach builder's premises, now demolished, at Hammersmith in London and is thought to have completed other projects outside of London at this time for which records have been lost. He is known to have completed the two low-relief bronze plaques, featuring the head of a river god and female figures, installed to mark the opening of the Blackwall Tunnel in 1897. He collaborated with architect Inigo Thomas on a decorative scheme for the gardens at Barrow Court near Bristol. Tasked with providing sculptures for twelve pillars along a boundary wall, Drury carved a sequence of female heads from a baby to that of an old women to represent the months of the year from January to December.

Drury's original life-size bronze version of Circe was purchased for a park in Leeds and is now in Leeds City Museum. This led to him receiving several commissions in that city, including for the eight lamp standards representing Morning and Evening positioned in Leeds City Square. Drury was awarded a gold medal at the 1900 Paris International Exhibition for a version of Circe and for a bust of a child, The Age of Innocence. The art historian Benedict Read considered the latter as one of the 'major icons' of the New Sculpture movement. In 1905, Drury exhibited a new cast of the Evening head titled Spirit of the Night and in 1911 carved a marble version of the statue.

Architect John Belcher hired Drury, and others, to create the external decoration for Electra House at Moorgate in central London in 1902, and he also employed him, the following year, to sculpt external features for the nearby offices of the Royal London Friendly Society in Finsbury Square. For the latter scheme, Drury carved several female faces and half-figures including a large keystone figure above the main entrance, consisting of the head of a woman wearing a bronze helmet and framed by oak and ivy branches. The model for this composition was shown at the Royal Academy in 1904 and was widely praised.

=== Major works ===
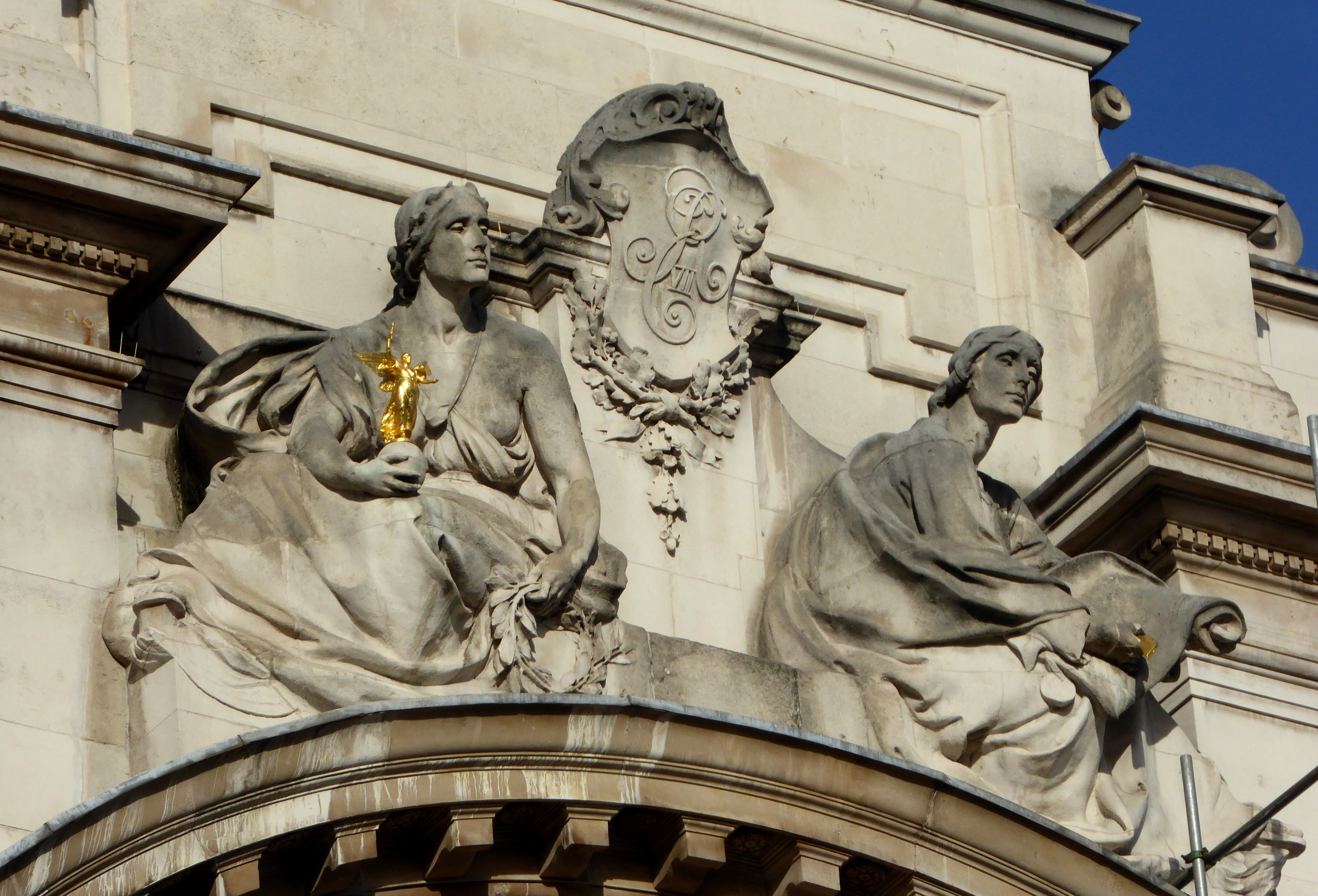
Victory and Fame, Old War Office Building

By 1904, Drury had become established as one of the foremost architectural sculptors active in Britain at the time and this led to the series of commissions for which he is perhaps best known, for the War Office in Whitehall, for the facade of the Victoria and Albert Museum and for Vauxhall Bridge.

For the Old War Office Building on Horse Guards Avenue and Whitehall, Drury created four groups of two seated, twice life-size, female figures in Portland stone during 1904 and 1905. The pairs were The Sorrow of Peace opposite The Winged Messinger of Peace, the Horrors of War against the Dignity of War, Truth and Justice plus Victory and Fame. The artistic choices Drury made with the pairings and the amount of detail he incorporated into the carvings drew much attention in the newspaper coverage of the new building. For example, the War pairing contrasted a figure of Minerva holding a sword and shield with a more fearful figure holding a skull while some of the figures had gilded bronze attachments such as Victory who holds a small gilded statuette and Truth who has a gilded mirror. Although the works were 70 feet above street level it was reported that crowds of sightseers gathered to view them.

In late 1904 the London County Council commissioned Drury and F. W. Pomeroy to each create four colossal bronze figures for niches on the piers supporting the new Vauxhall Bridge. For the eastern, downstream, side of the bridge Drury created four female figures representing the Fine Arts, holding a statuette and palette, Science holding a globe, Education and Local Government.

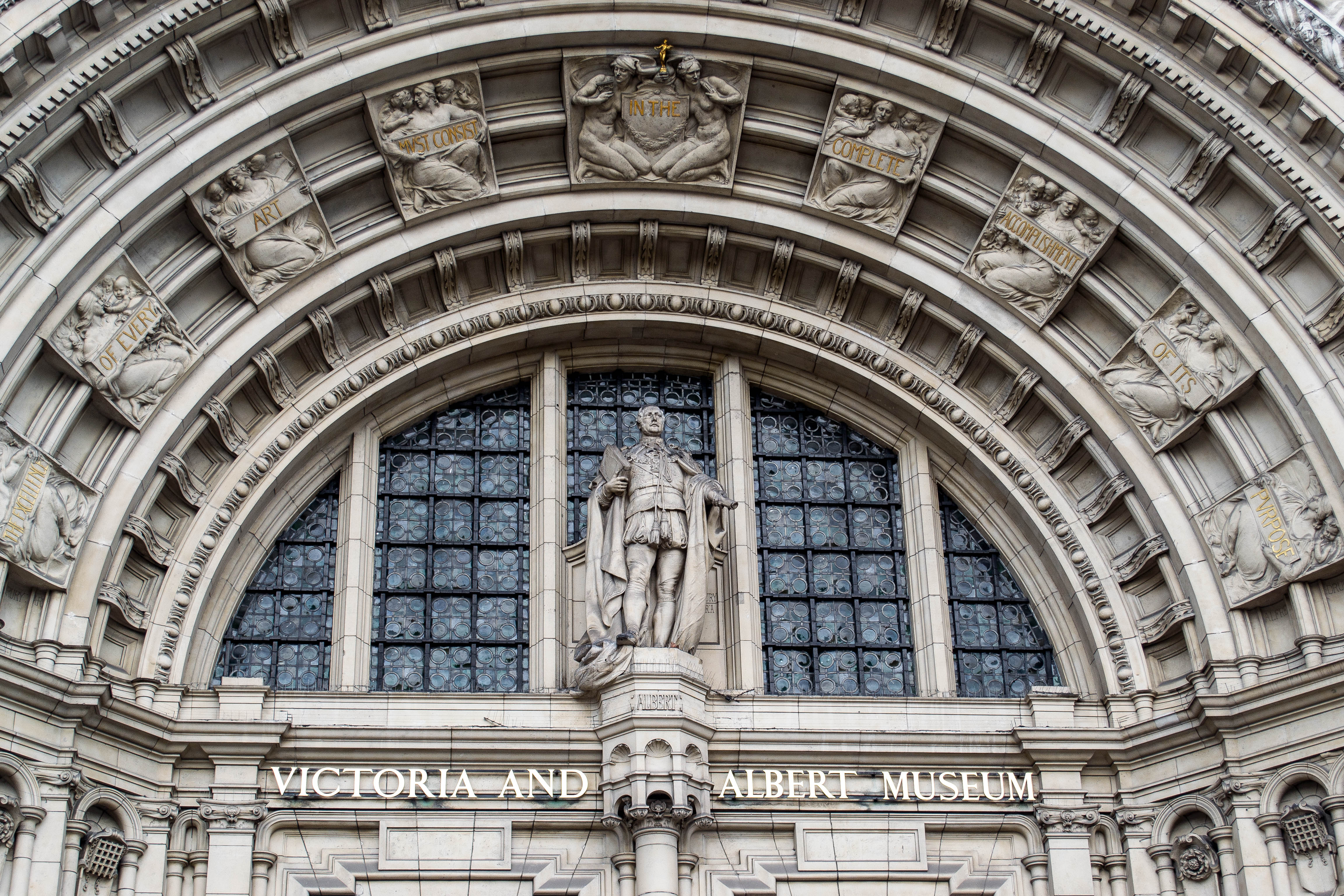
Victoria and Albert Museum, Cromwell Road entrance with statue of Albert, Prince Consort

By March 1905 Aston Webb, the architect of the Cromwell Road extension to the Victoria and Albert Museum had commissioned over twenty sculptors to provide statues, carvings and decorations for the facade of the building. Webb allocated what he considered the most prominent areas to Drury and George Frampton. The area over the main entrance arch was assigned to Frampton who created spandrel figures of Truth and Beauty for the space. The area under the arch and the remainder of the main entrance were allocated to Drury. Within the curve of entrance arch he created nine low-relief panels featuring kneeling or crouching female figures holding plaques with gold lettering that when read together form a quotation from Sir Joshua Reynolds. Below the arch, and immediately above the main entrance, is Drury's statue of Albert, Prince Consort and above the arch is his statue of Queen Victoria, carrying a staff and flanked by figures of St George and St Michael. Drury's work was singled out for praise in art press reviews when the overall scheme was completed in 1908. That same year, Webb commissioned Drury to produce a relief panel, of children at play, for the new offices of the Grand Trunk Railway Company in Cockspur Street in central London.

=== Exhibition record ===
Drury was elected an Associate of the Royal Academy of Arts in 1900 and a full Academician in 1913. He exhibited works at the academy each year from 1885 to 1942, and at the Royal Scottish Academy between 1903 and 1917. He also showed works at the Aberdeen Artists Society, the Royal Glasgow Institute of the Fine Arts and at Leeds City Art Gallery on a regular basis. He was a member of the International Society of Sculptors, Painters and Gravers and, from 1899, a member of the Art Workers' Guild. In 1932, Drury received the Royal Society of British Sculptors' silver medal for his statue of Joshua Reynolds in the courtyard of Burlington House in London.

== Personal life ==
Drury lived and worked at Gunter Grove in Chelsea, London.

In 1900, Drury married the artist Phoebe Maud Turner. The couple had two children, including artist Paul Dalou Drury.

Alfred Drury died on Christmas Eve 1944, aged 88.

== Selected public works ==
=== 1885–1904 ===
Image	Title / subject	Location and coordinates	Date	Type	Material	Dimensions	Designation	Wikidata	Notes
More images	The Genius of Painting	Victoria and Albert Museum	1886	Statuette	Terracotta	39.5cm			
More images	The Age of Innocence	Victoria and Albert Museum	1887	Bust	Plaster	67.7cm			Several subsequent versions in both marble and bronze exist
More images	Circe	Leeds City Museum	c. 1895	Statue group	Bronze		Grade II	Q266566284	Previously sited at Central Gardens in Park Square and in Leeds City Art Gallery.
	Daughters of the Year	Barrow Court, Somerset	c. 1897	12 busts on pillars	Stone		Grade II*	Q17533935	
	Monument to Penn Symons	Victoria Gardens, Saltash, Cornwall	Unveiled 1901	Relief panel on tapered column	Bronze and stone		Grade II		
More images	Joseph Priestley	Leeds City Square	1903	Statue on pedestal	Bronze and granite		Grade II	Q26655864	
More images	Morning and Evening	Leeds City Square	1903	Eight statues on blocks supporting streetlamps	Bronze and granite		Grade II		
More images	Alexander McLeod (1832–1902)	Former RACS HQ, Powis Street, London	1903	Statue in niche	Terracotta		Grade II		
More images	Queen Victoria	Guildhall Square, Portsmouth	1903	Statue on pedestal	Bronze and granite		Grade II	Q26398294	
More images	1899–1902 South African War Memorial	Clifton College, Bristol	1904	Statue, of Saint George, on pedestal	Bronze and Portland stone		Grade II*	Q26678257	Architects;- WS Paul & RC James.
More images	Queen Victoria	Princes Way, Bradford	1904	Statue on pedestal	Bronze and stone		Grade II	Q26425844	
	Lord Byron	Nottingham Castle	1904	Bust on plinth	Bronze and granite				

=== 1905–1909 ===
Image	Title / subject	Location and coordinates	Date	Type	Material	Dimensions	Designation	Wikidata	Notes
More images	Queen Victoria	Kent Terrace, Wellington, New Zealand	1905	Statue on pedestal	Bronze and stone		Category II	Q79312013	
	Albert, Prince Consort	Facade of Victoria and Albert Museum, London	c.1905–6	Statue in niche	Stone				
	Inspiration	Facade of Victoria and Albert Museum, London	c.1905–6	Statue in niche	Stone				
	Knowledge	Facade of Victoria and Albert Museum, London	c.1905–6	Statue in niche	Stone				
	Queen Victoria, St George and St Michael	Facade of Victoria and Albert Museum, London	1906	Statues in niches	Stone				
More images	Fine Art, Science, Government & Education	East side of Vauxhall Bridge, London	1907	Four statues	Bronze		Grade II*	Q1142134	
More images	Bishop Richard Hooker	Cathedral Close, Exeter	1907	Statue on pedestal	Marble and granite		Grade II	Q26398018	
More images	South Lancashire Regiment, Boer War Memorial	Queens Gardens, Warrington	1907	Statue on pedestal	Bronze and stone		Grade II	Q26614958	
	South and West Africa Gate	Queen Victoria Memorial Gardens, The Mall, London	1908	Sculpture on pillar	Stone		Grade I		Part of Thomas Brock's Victoria Memorial, London

=== 1910–1919 ===
Image	Title / subject	Location and coordinates	Date	Type	Material	Dimensions	Designation	Wikidata	Notes
More images	Spencer Cavendish, 8th Duke of Devonshire	King Edward's Parade, Eastbourne	1910	Statue on pedestal	Bronze and granite		Grade II	Q26636085	
	Elizabeth Fry	Old Bailey, London	1913	Statue on pedestal	Marble				
More images	Edward VII	Fitzalan Square, Sheffield	1913	Statue on pedestal	Bronze and granite		Grade II	Q26560636	
More images	Edward VII	Union Terrace, Aberdeen	1914	Statue on pedestal	Granite		Category B	Q17770122	Pedestal by A.G.R. Mackenzie
	Charles Kingston	Victoria Square, Adelaide, Australia	1916	Statue on pedestal	Bronze and marble				

=== 1920–1931 ===
Image	Title / subject	Location and coordinates	Date	Type	Material	Dimensions	Designation	Wikidata	Notes
More images	London Troops War Memorial	Royal Exchange, London	1920	Column with statues	Stone and bronze		Grade II*	Q18575165	
More images	War memorial	Outside of St Mary's Church, Kidderminster	1922	Statue on pedestal with relief plaque	Bronze and limestone		Grade II	Q26671170	
More images	War memorial	Parliament Square, Hertford, Hertfordshire	1922	Sculpture on pedestal	Bronze and Portland stone		Grade II	Q26559085	Architect, Aston Webb
More images	War memorial	Grove Park, Weston-super-Mare	1922	Statue on pedestal	Bronze and stone		Grade II	Q26677665	
	War memorial	Lonsdale Quadrangle, Denstone College, Uttoxeter	1925	Statue of St George on pedestal	Bronze and stone		Grade II	Q26524254	Architect, Aston Webb
More images	Statue of Joshua Reynolds	Courtyard of Burlington House, London	1931	Statue on pedestal	Bronze and stone	2.9m tall	Grade II	Q18123341	

=== Other works ===
- The Boer War Memorial, a plaque in deep relief, in the Cloisters at New College, Oxford
- Rhodes University (Grahamstown) War Memorial to the 1914-1918 and 1939-1945 conflicts, depicting a medieval knight in armour and chain mail, with gauntletted hands resting on the hilt of his sword.
- Two relief panels and two spandrels in marble, 1916, representing the Golden Jubilee of Queen Victoria, the Queen's proclamation of 1858, Industry and Commerce for the Victoria Memorial, Kolkata
