= Australia Gate =

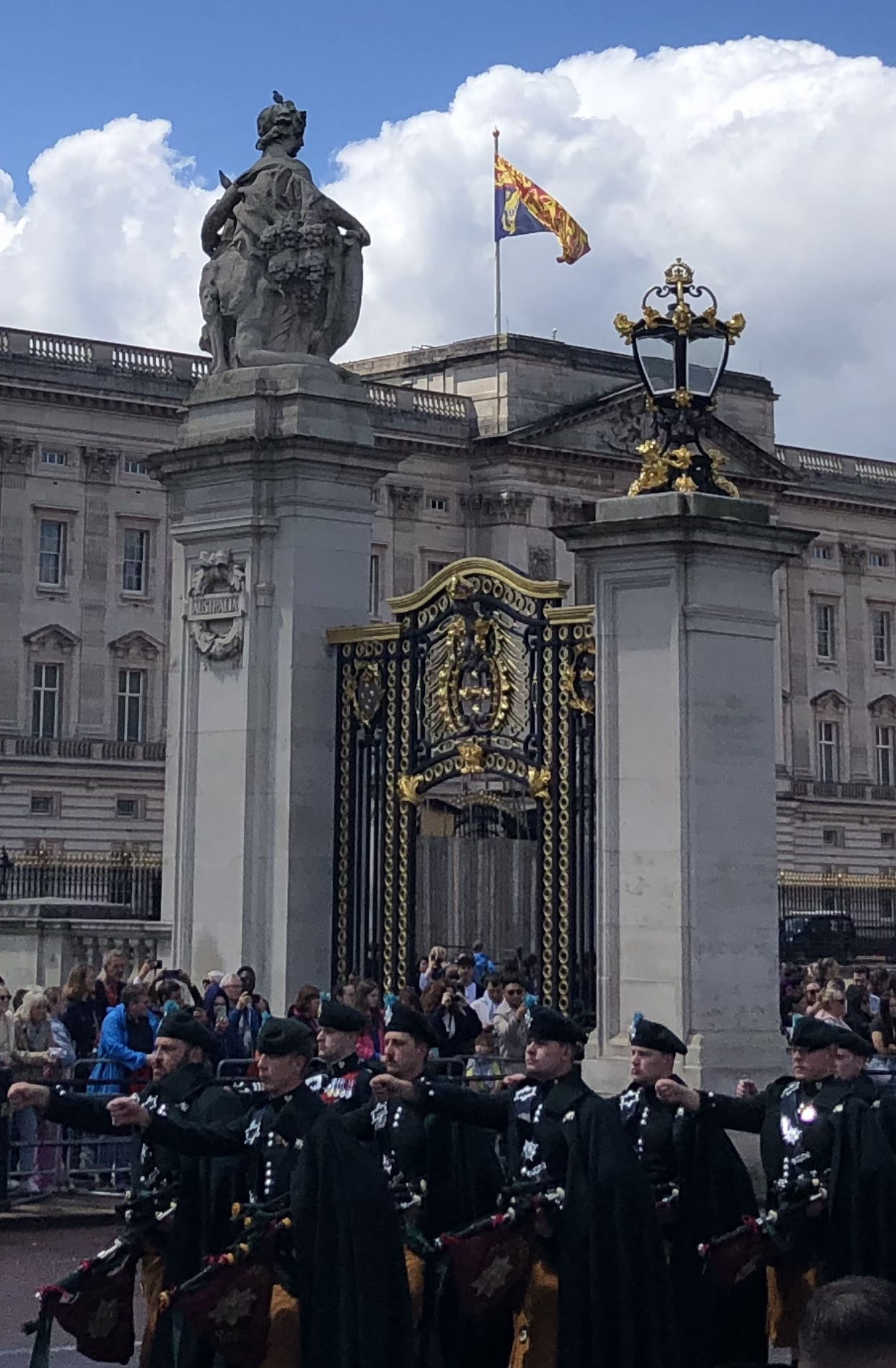
- The Drums and Pipes of the Irish Guards passing through Australia Gate, King's Birthday, 2024

General information
- Type: Gate
- Location: Queen Victoria Memorial scheme, London, United Kingdom
- Coordinates: 51°30′04″N 0°08′23″W
- Opened: 1911

Design and construction
- Architect: Sir Aston Webb

Australia Gate forms part of the Queen Victoria Memorial scheme in London. The gate was presented by Australia as a tribute, following the death of Queen Victoria in 1901. The gate is situated on Spur Road, directly opposite from the Canada Gate. The memorial was formally unveiled by King George V in 1911.

== History and description ==
In 1906, a sum of £25,000 was donated towards the funding of both the central Queen Victoria memorial and the gates themselves, which was approved by the Australian Parliament, and subsequently given to Sir William Treloar, the Lord Mayor of London at the time.

The figures on the pillars of the gate were sculpted by Francis Derwent Wood working under Sir Thomas Brock. The iron gates were made by the Bromsgrove Guild in the Arts and Crafts style.

The gate is in the same style as its Canadian counterpart and the front gates of Buckingham Palace. The left section is composed of a pillar, topped with a cherub holding a kangaroo, alongside a shield depicting an earlier rendition of the coat of arms of Australia. This section of the gate contains the state badges of Victoria, New South Wales, and Queensland.

The right section comprises a pillar topped with another cherub, alongside a sheep, and the earlier coat of arms of Australia. This section of the gate contains the state badges of Tasmania, South Australia and Western Australia.

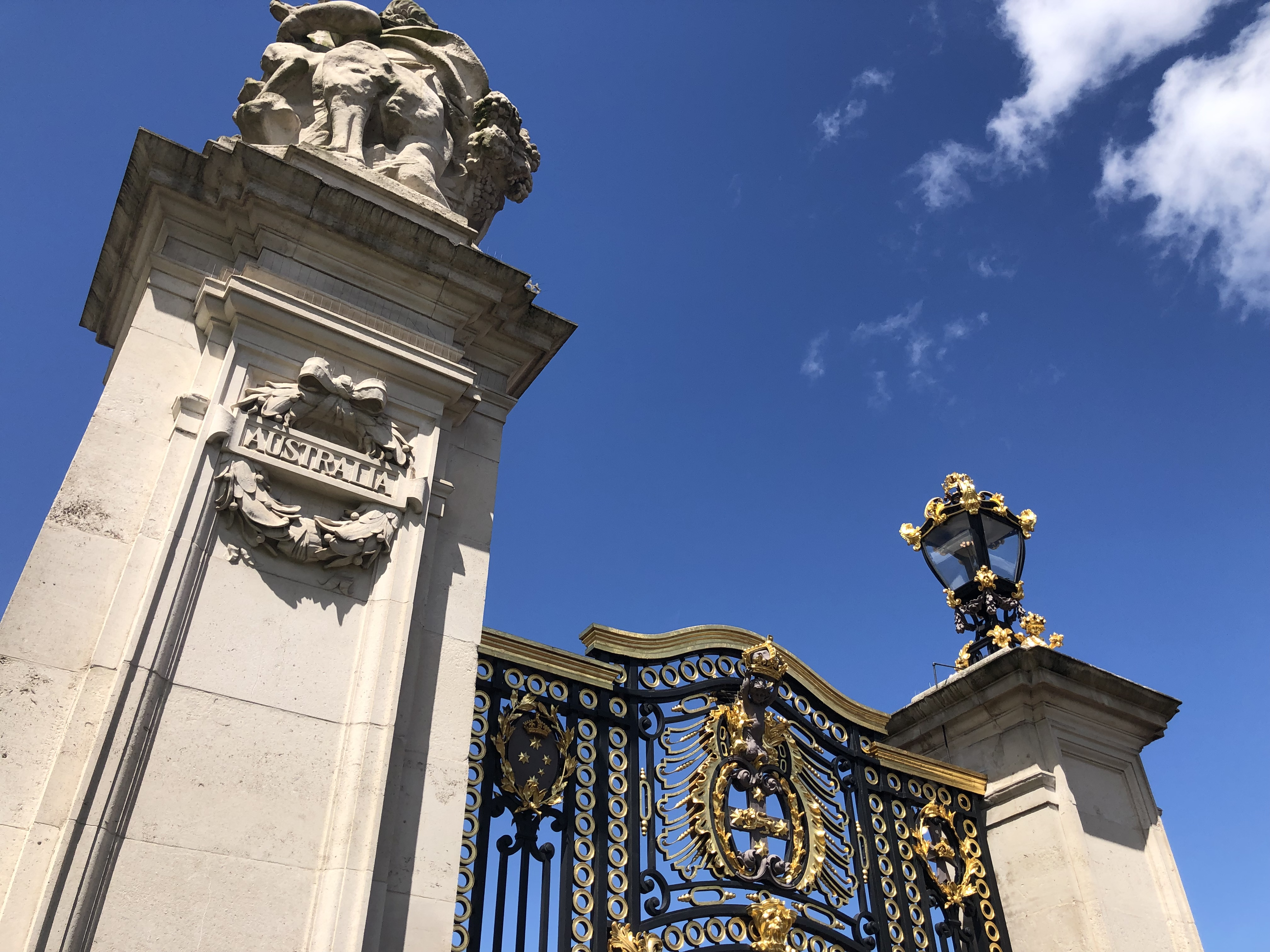
Left section

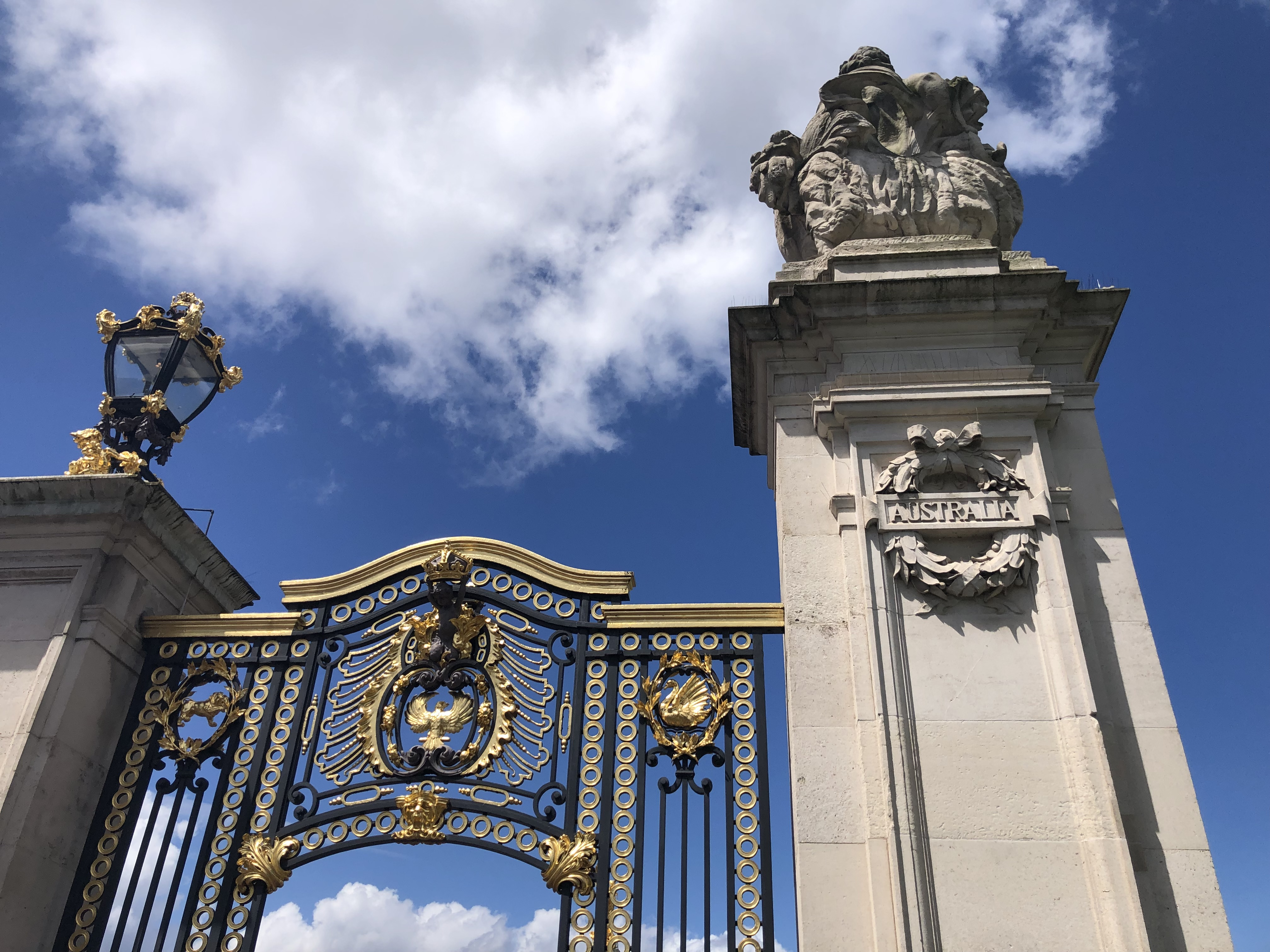
Right section

=== State badges appearing on the Gate ===
Victoria

New South Wales

Queensland

Tasmania

South Australia

Western Australia

== See also ==
- Australian War Memorial, London
- High Commission of Australia, London
- South and West Africa Gate
