= Canada Gate =

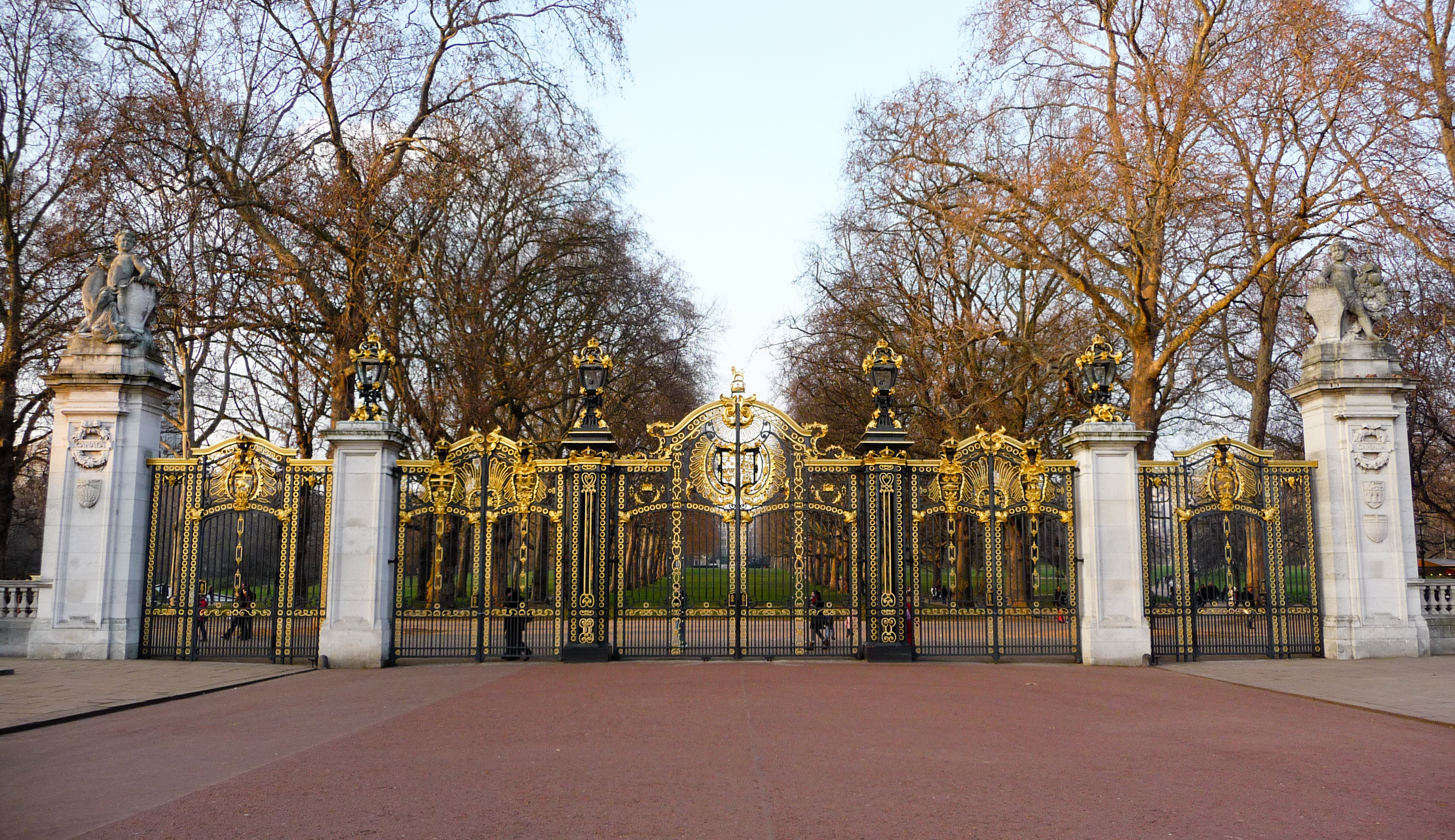
- Canada Gate

General information
- Type: Gate
- Location: Queen Victoria Memorial scheme, London, United Kingdom
- Coordinates: 51°30′09″N 0°08′29″W
- Opened: 1911

Design and construction
- Architect: Sir Aston Webb

Canada Gate forms part of the Queen Victoria Memorial scheme in London. An entrance to the Green Park, one of the eight Royal Parks in London, the gate was presented to London by Canada (at the time in 1901 the senior Dominion of the British Empire) as part of a vast memorial scheme dedicated to Queen Victoria, who died in 1901.

The entire memorial, more an act of town planning than funerary monument, was designed by Sir Aston Webb. It takes the form of a processional route from Trafalgar Square to Buckingham Palace. Beginning at Admiralty Arch, the project takes in The Mall and culminates in a "rond point" before the palace, with Sir Thomas Brock's Victoria Memorial at its centre. Canada Gate was commissioned, in 1905, along with the gates for Buckingham Palace and two other similar, but smaller gates presented by Australia and South Africa. The commission was won by the Bromsgrove Guild (a company of modern artists and designers associated with the Arts and Crafts Movement) who completed the work and had the gate in situ by 1911.

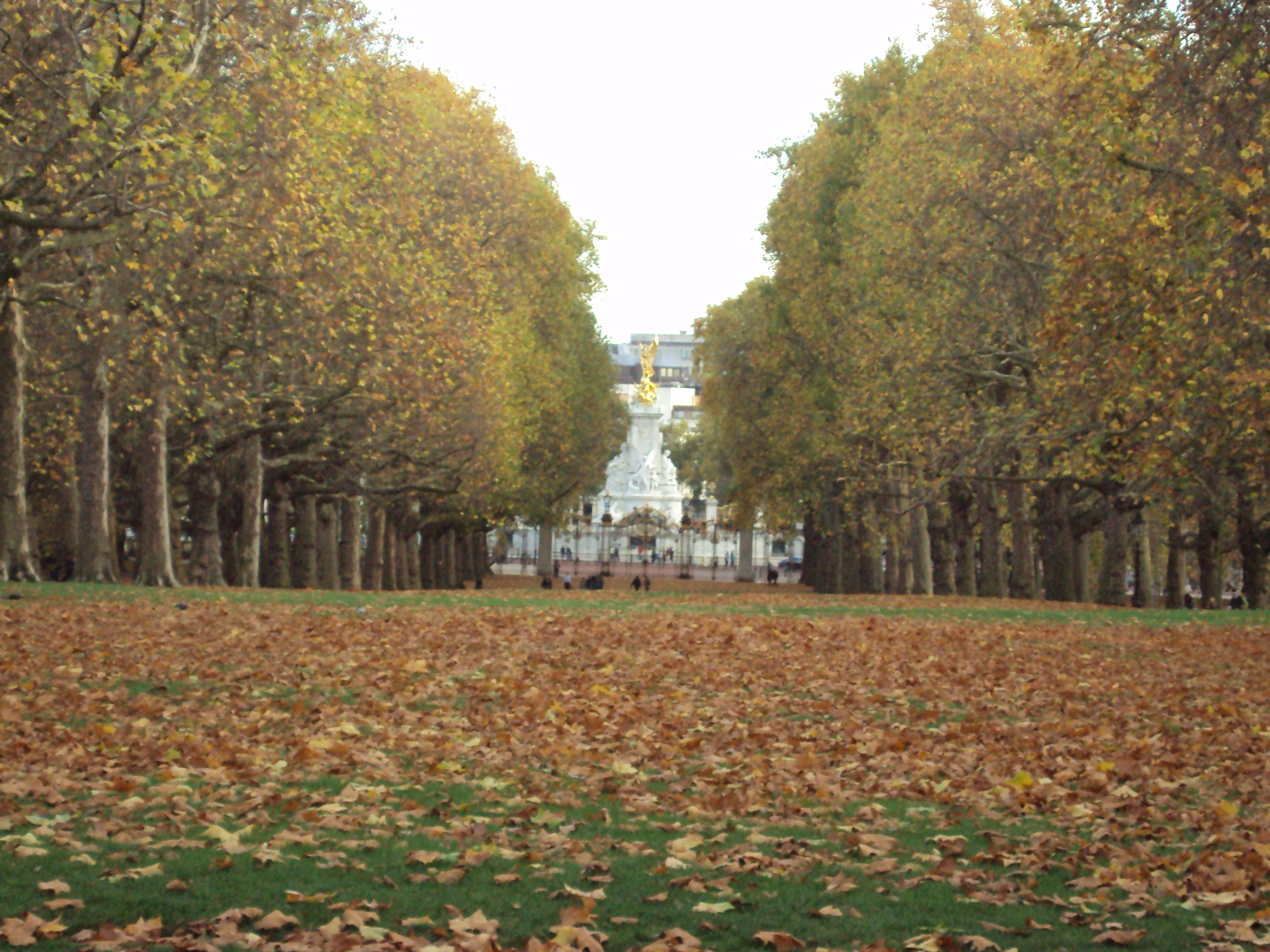
Avenue leading to the Canada Gate and Victoria memorial. The Canada Memorial is within the park, just to the right of the gate and in sight of the palace which is to the right of the memorial.

The gate stands to the north side of the "rond point" at the junction with Constitution Hill; today, a congested roundabout, but occasionally closed to traffic when the Mall is required for state processions from the palace. From the gate, a long double avenue stretches the width of the park through to Piccadilly.

The gate is in the same style as those of Buckingham Palace and bears the coats of arms of six of the seven Canadian provinces of the time (left to right: Manitoba, Ontario, Quebec, Nova Scotia, New Brunswick, and Prince Edward Island), while in the centre of the gate is the original coat of arms of Canada of 1868. In design, Canada Gate takes the form of a screen consisting of 5 portals of gilded wrought iron, the central section being the principal and largest gate; the double gates are supported on columns of iron. The two wrought iron bays flanking the central gate contain smaller gates, while the two terminating bays contain smaller pedestrian gates. The screen is terminated by two massive pillars of Portland stone surmounted by patriotic statuary. On the pillars are reliefs of the shields of three other Canadian provinces, British Columbia (left) and Alberta and Saskatchewan (both right). The province of Newfoundland and Labrador is not represented as it was a Dominion in 1911. The flanking inner columns are smaller and, like the iron posts, are crowned by gas lanterns of similar design to those on the pillars of the palace railings.

== See also ==
- Canada Memorial
- Australia Gate
- South and West Africa Gate
