= Statue of Joshua Reynolds =

Statue in the courtyard of Burlington House, London

Coordinates: 51.508796°N 0.139269°W

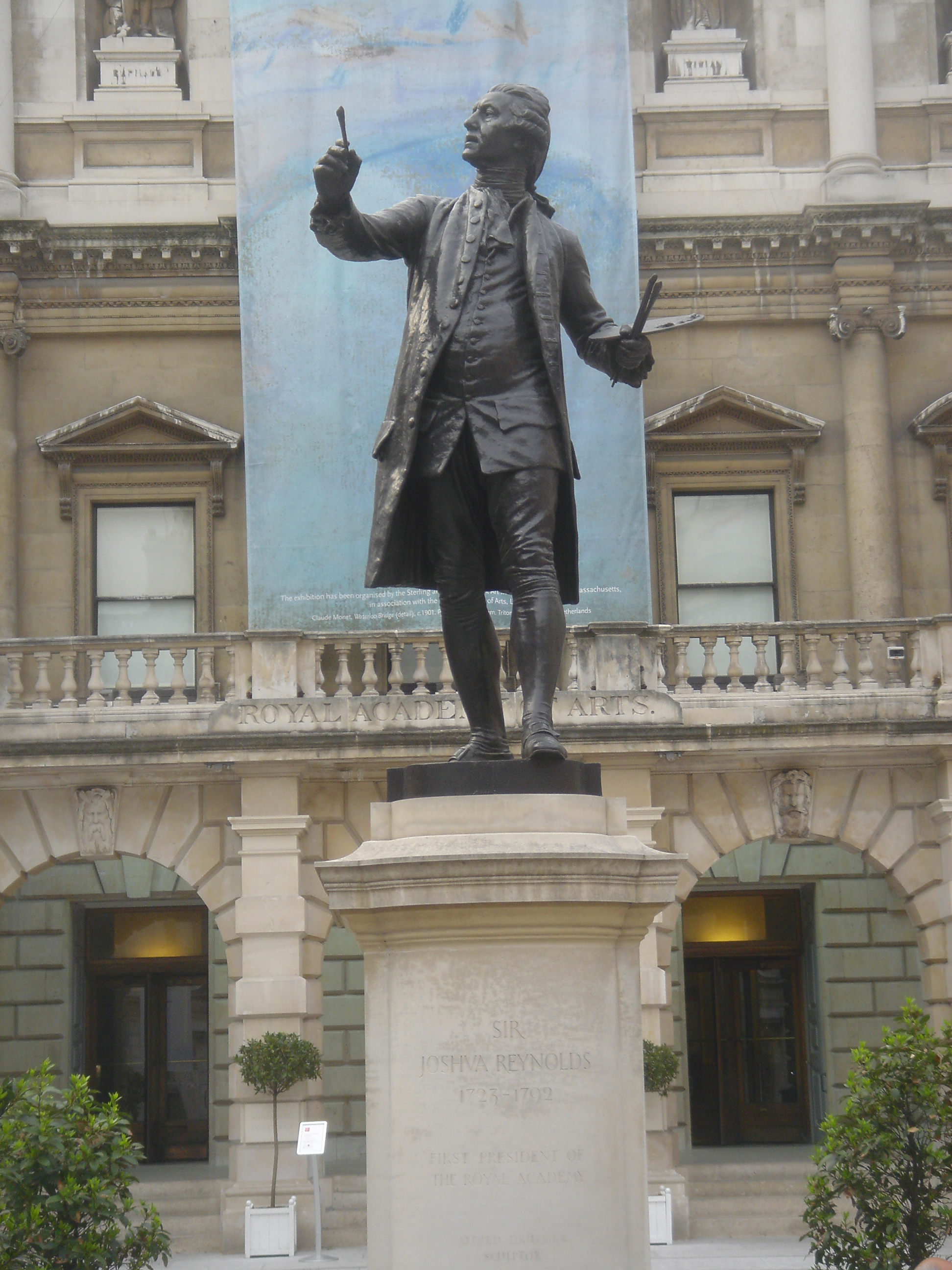
The statue in 2007

A statue of Sir Joshua Reynolds stands in the Annenberg Courtyard of Burlington House, off Piccadilly in the City of Westminster, London, England. Reynolds was the first president of the Royal Academy, who occupy the main wing of Burlington House.

The work is by Alfred Drury, himself a member of the RA, and was erected by the RA and the Leighton Fund in 1931. It was Grade II listed in February 1970 and its inscription was re-carved 2002.

Near the statue are fountains, installed in 2000, arranged in the pattern of the planets at the time of Reynolds' birth.
