= Paul Drury =

British artist and printmaker (1903–1987)

Paul Drury (14 October 1903 – 19 May 1987) was an artist and printmaker born Albert Paul Dalou Drury, the son of sculptor Alfred Drury.

== Early life ==
Drury was born in Brockley, south London in 1903. He was educated at Bristol Grammar and Westminster School. In 1921 he entered Goldsmiths School of Art in New Cross, London.

== Career as artist ==
Drury was influenced by the work of Samuel Palmer, a 19th-century pastoralist, and this is seen in his early etchings in 1922. After study, Drury taught at the leading British Art Schools of the time including the Central School of Art, Heatherley School of Fine Art, and latterly at the school from where he graduated, Goldsmiths.

In 1944 he was commissioned, with other leading artists of the day, to produce a series of prints for Cowan's, a leading artist's printmaker.

After World War II, Drury returned to Goldsmiths and became part of the mid 20th century Goldsmiths School. Drury eventually became Principal of Goldsmiths in 1966 for three years.

Drury produced 92 etchings, almost half of which were portraits and a quarter of which were landscapes. Although the majority of his work was portraiture, he is known for his landscapes including September and Nicols Farm.

He exhibited regularly at the Royal Academy in London, and, amongst others, via the British Council at the Museum of Fine Arts, Boston; the National Gallery of Canada; the National Gallery of New Zealand and in the British Pavilion of the 1939 World's fair in New York.

His work is held at the National Portrait Gallery, London, the Museum of Fine Arts, Boston; the National Gallery of Canada and elsewhere.

Drury was President of the Royal Society of Painter Printmakers for five years from 1970 to 1975.

== Personal life ==
At 10 years old, Drury lost the sight in one eye, due to an air-gun pellet, whilst playing with his brother.

He married the painter Enid Solomon in 1937; two years later at the outbreak of war, Drury could not serve due to his damaged sight. Instead of becoming a war artist, he worked at Queen Mary's Hospital, in Roehampton in the plaster workshop.

Paul Drury died on 19 May 1987. The Daily Telegraph obituary praised him as ‘One of the most distinguished etchers and draughtsmen in that remarkably gifted generation of printmakers who grew up between the two World Wars. [His landscapes] contain a deep poetic quality which was to exert a powerful influence on the succeeding generation of neo-Romantic artists.’
