= Bromsgrove Guild of Applied Arts =

British decorative arts firm (1898–1966)

- Founded: 1898
- Defunct: 1966

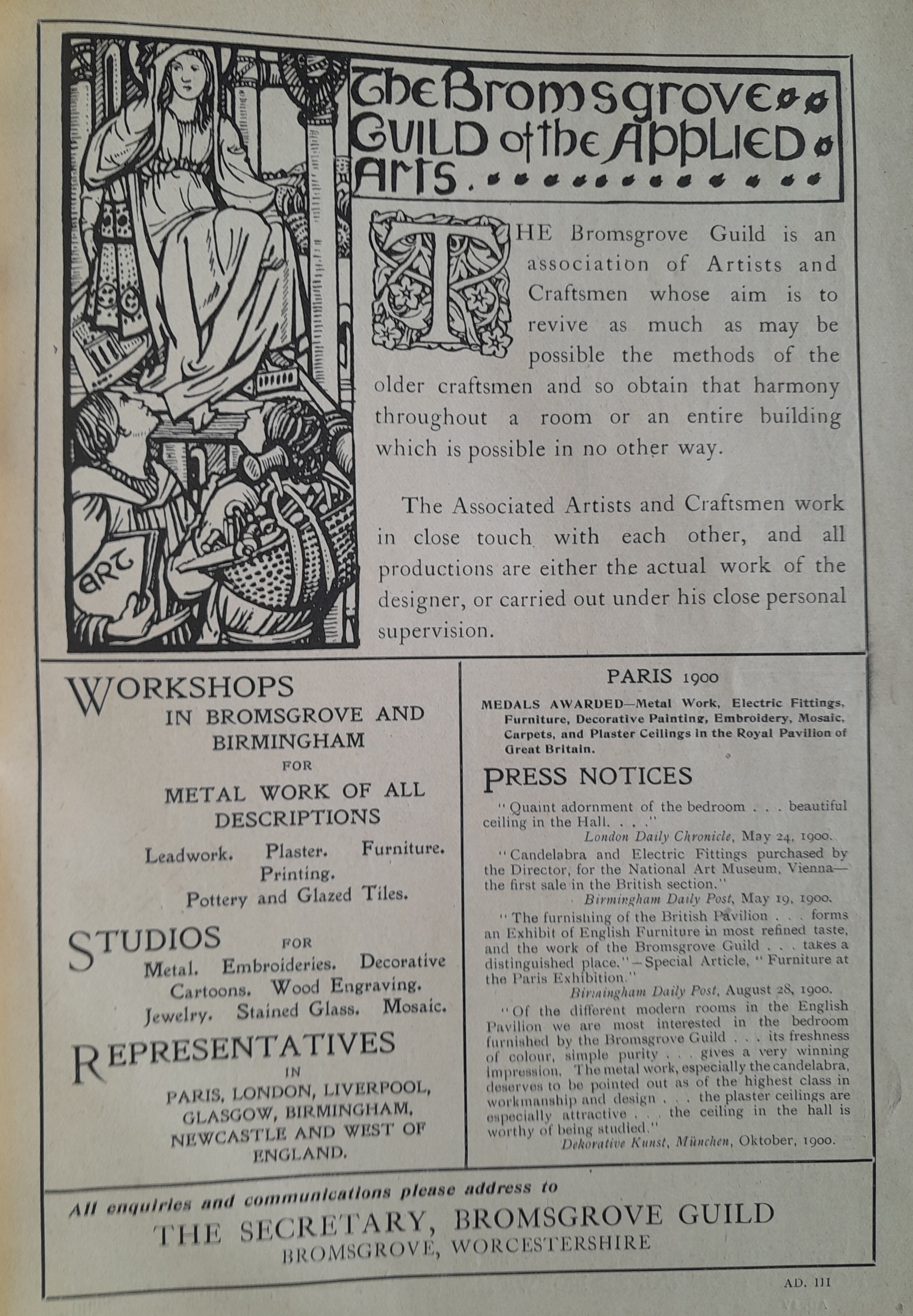
Bromsgrove Guild of the Applied Arts advert

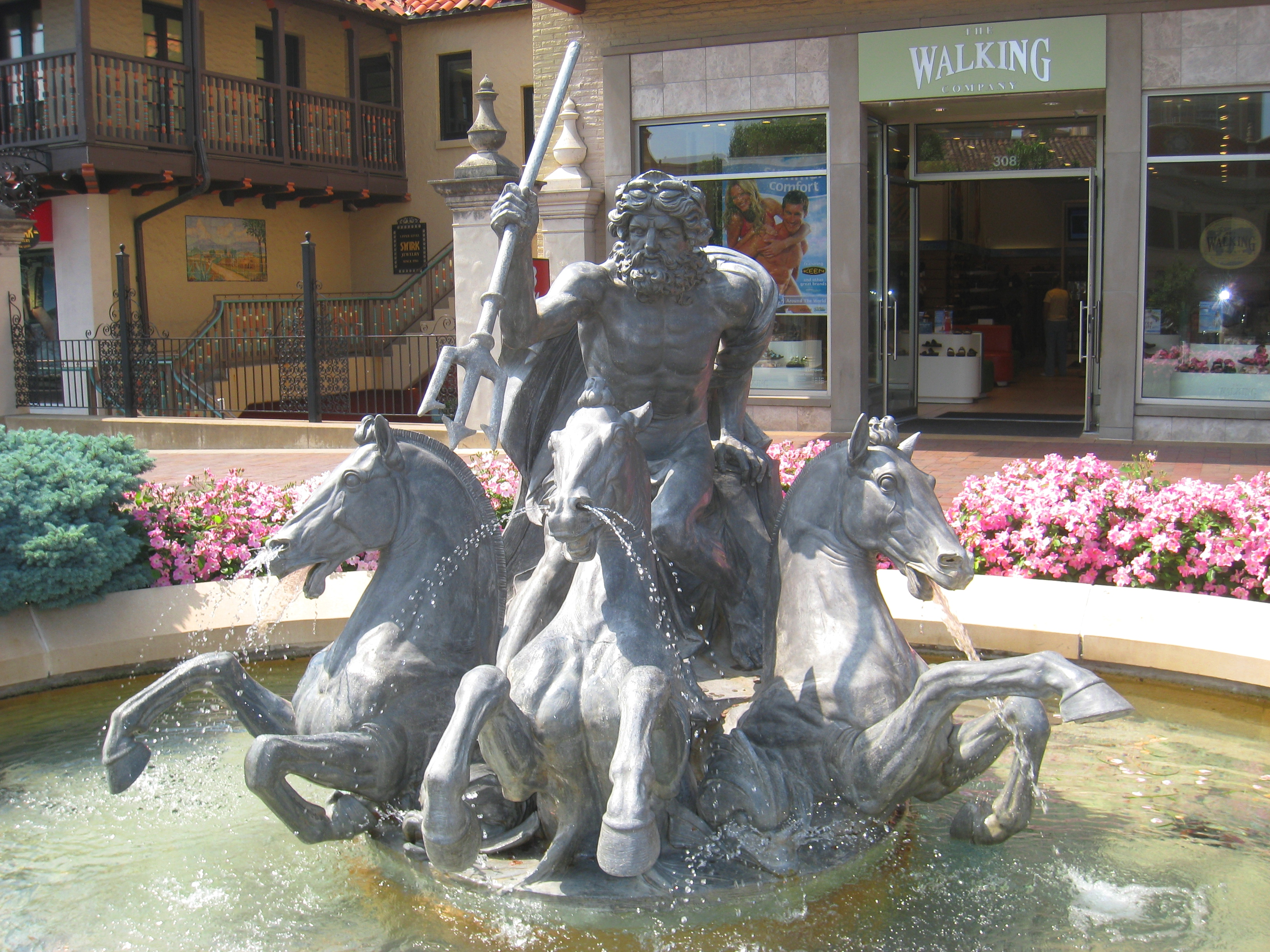
Neptune, by the Bromsgrove Guild of Applied Arts, 1911.

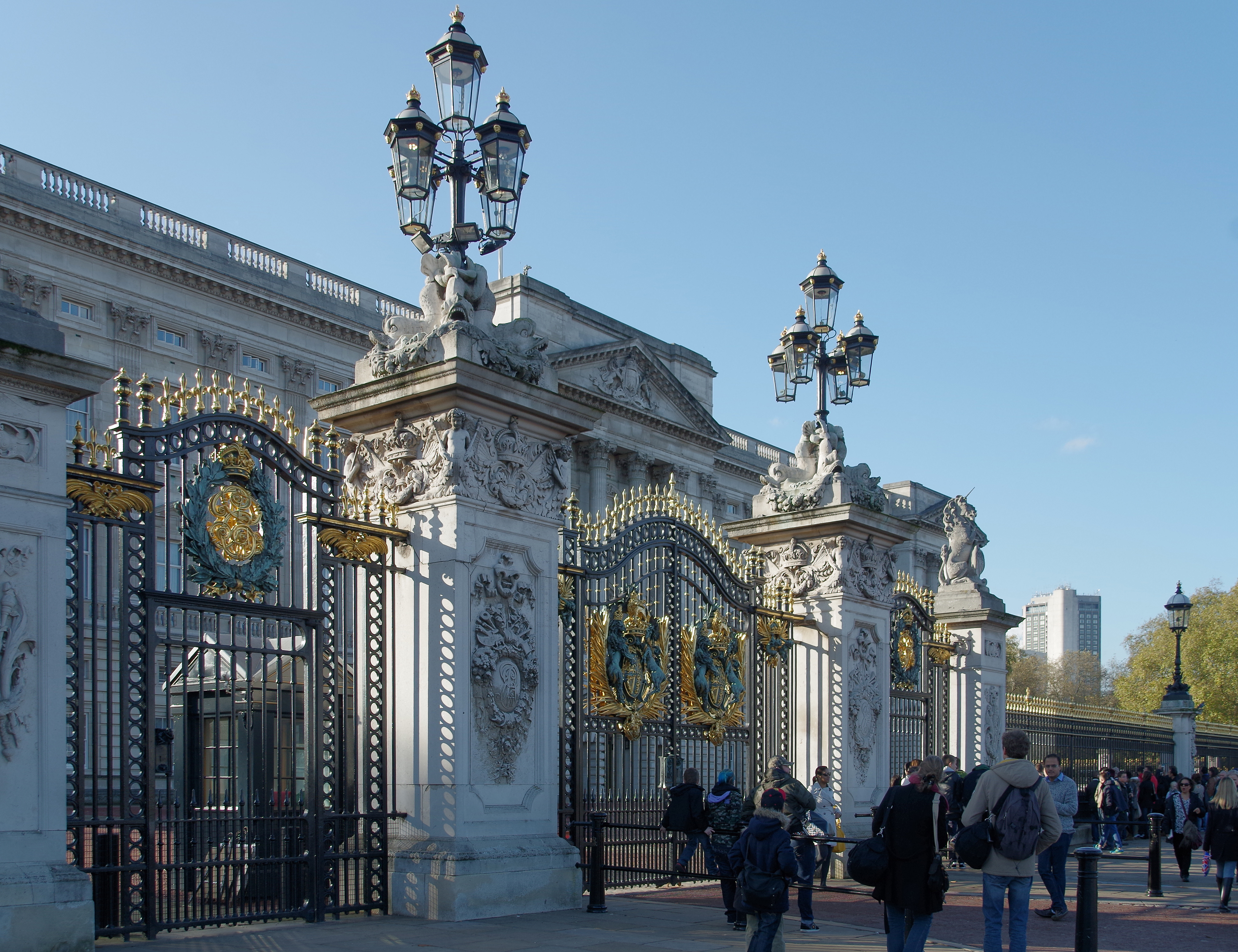
Main gate of Buckingham Palace

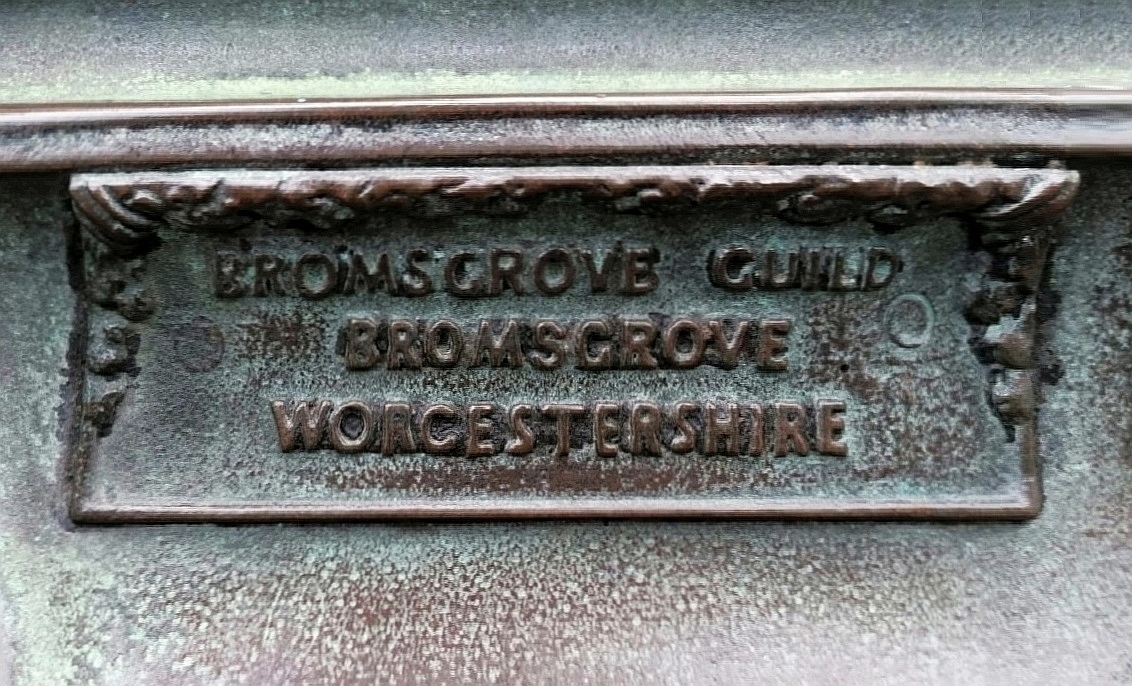
Bromsgrove Guild maker's mark on the main gate of Buckingham Palace

The Bromsgrove Guild of Applied Arts (1898–1966) was a company of modern artists and designers associated with the Arts and Crafts Movement, but which also embraced other major design motifs. Founded by Walter Gilbert, the guild worked in metal, wood, plaster, bronze, tapestry, glass and other mediums.

The Guild received a Royal Warrant in 1908.

The Guild's most famous works on public display are the main gates of Buckingham Palace, Canada Gate and Australia Gate, part of Sir Aston Webb's memorial scheme to Queen Victoria.

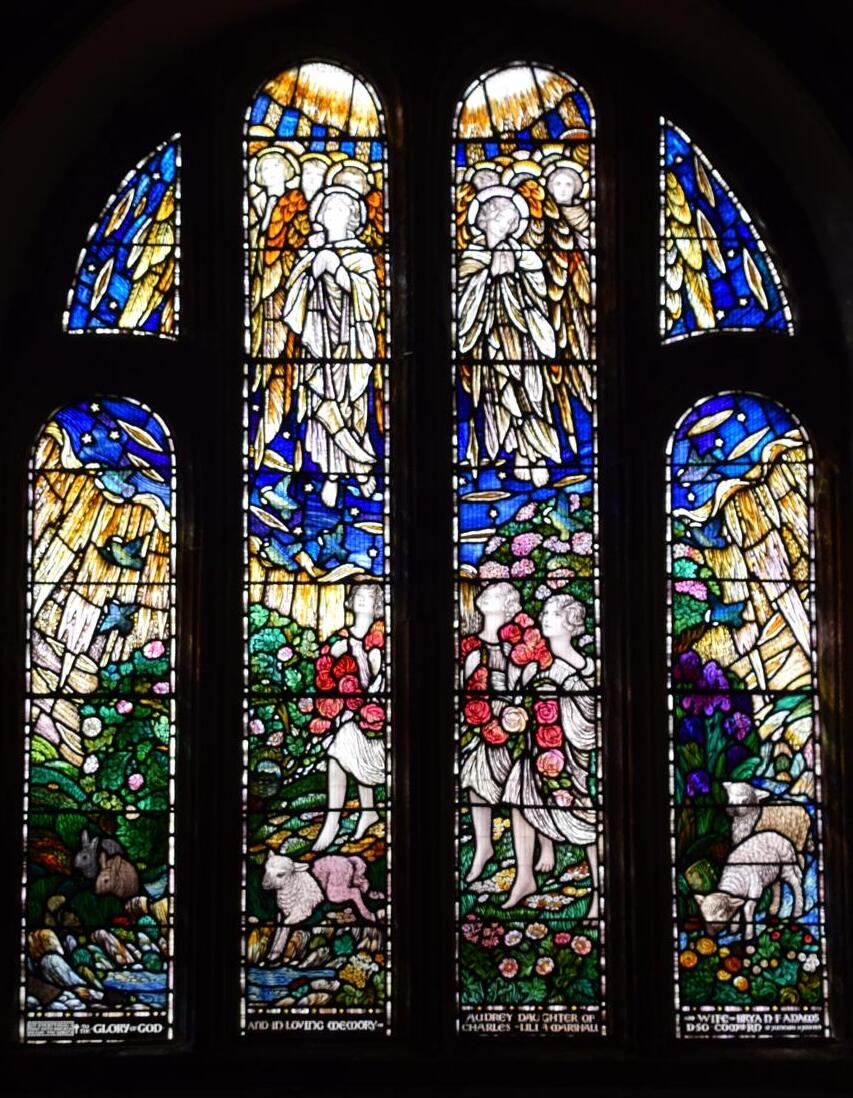
Stained glass window by Archibald John Davies for All Saints Church in Thurlestone, Devon, c.1930

In 1906, Gilbert invited the Birmingham-based stained glass artist Archibald John Davies to establish a glass manufacturing studio within the Guild's premises in Bromsgrove. Trained under Henry Payne at the Birmingham Municipal School of Arts and Crafts, Davies style and approach to glassmaking was firmly rooted in the Arts and Crafts tradition and was thus highly complementary to the broader artistic sentiments of the Guild.

Under Davies' forty-seven year tenure, the glass studio was one of the most productive of the Guild's business functions. It produced over 240 windows for locations across Great Britain and more than 100 more for international locations, particularly for churches in Canada and South Africa. The majority of these were privately commissioned memorials for churches, usually involving the reglazing of an existing window in a pre-existing building. Davies also led production of the decorative domes for first-class areas of the passenger liner Orvieto, built for the Orient Steam Navigation Company between 1908 and 1911. The glass studio closed in 1953 following Davies' death.

The Guild's fortunes were adversely effected by the great depression during the 1930s. From 1946 the company was managed by George Whewell. By this stage the firm had lost much of its specialist expertise leading Whewell to sub-contract many of the Guild's post-war commissions. As a result, the size of the workforce steadily declined until there was only a skeleton staff. The Guild was closed for good in 1966.

== Famous works ==
- Liver birds, Royal Liver Building, Liverpool
- Trim on the Lusitania
- Trim on the RMS Queen Mary
- The statue of Hygieia at Chequers
- Plasterwork at Averley, Glasgow.
- Plasterwork at the Central Station Hotel, Glasgow.
- Stained Glass at Stoneleigh, Glasgow.
- The gates and sculpture at the Phoenix Assurance Building, Glasgow.
- Trim on the Cunard War Memorial, Liverpool.
- English altar and rails St Paul's Church, Bedford.
- Various items at Holy Trinity Church, Southport.
- Chancel gates and reredos in Liverpool Cathedral
- Items at Church of the Holy Trinity and St Mary, Dodford, Worcestershire
- The main gates of Buckingham Palace
- Terpsichore on the facade of the Fortune Theatre
- The mosaic in the pedimented gable at 50 Anlaby Road, Hull
- Choir Stalls at All Saints Cathedral, Halifax

== Sources ==
- Wells, Griffith T. (May 1912). "Sculpture in the garden: Some interesting work by the Bromsgrove Guild, of Worcestershire, England". Arts & Decoration. 2 (7): 260–261. JSTOR 43799690.

52.3324°N 2.0621°W
