= Victoria Memorial, London =

Public memorial by Thomas Brock

Victoria Memorial
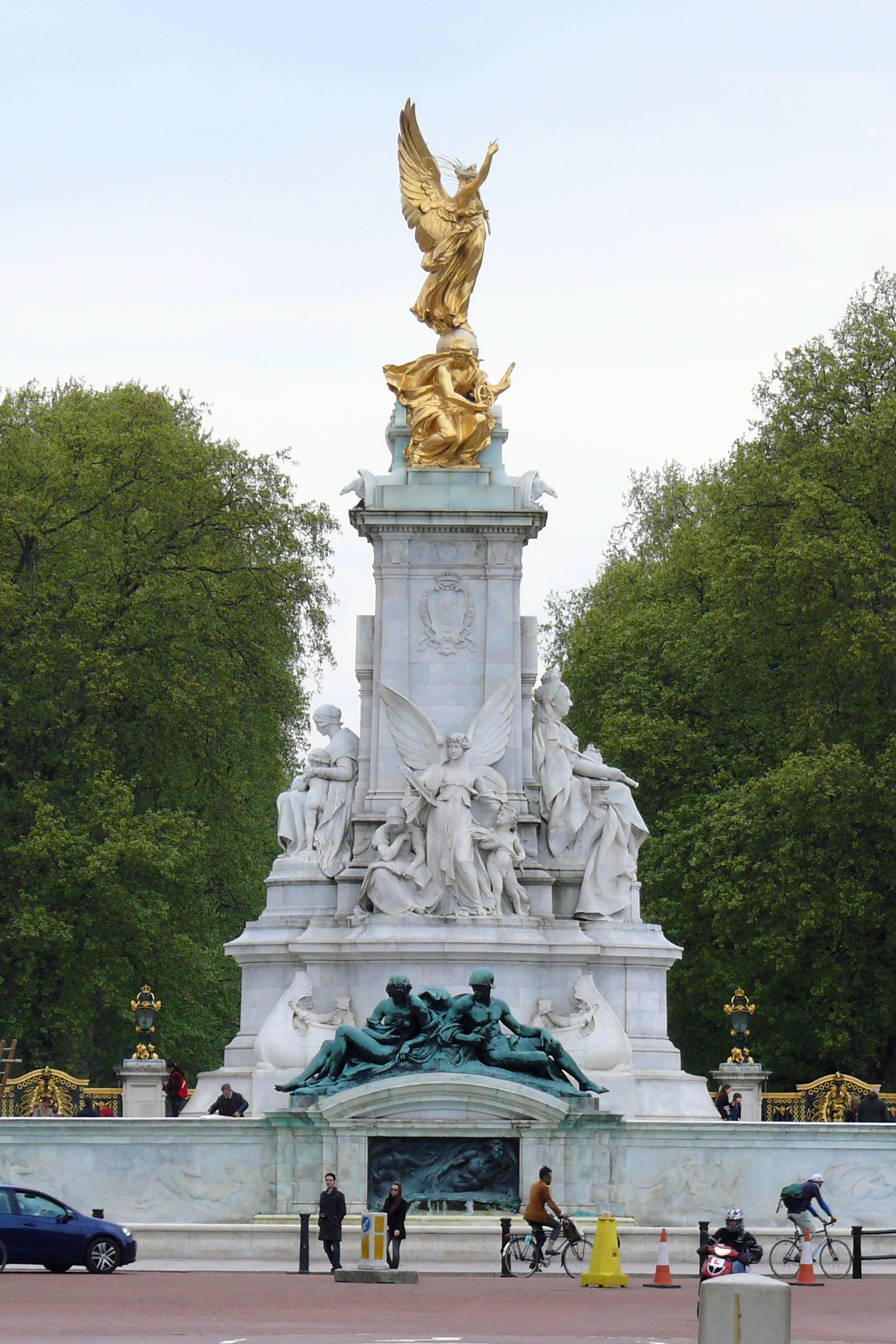

- The Victoria Monument in central London
- 51°30′06.65″N 00°08′26.34″W
- Location: The Mall
- OS grid reference: TQ291797

History
- Unveiled: 16 May 1911
- Built: 1901 (memorial gardens) 1906–24 (monument)

Site notes
- Height: 25 m
- Area: London, SW1
- Sculptor: Sir Thomas Brock
- Architectural style: Beaux-Arts / Edwardian Baroque
- Restored: bronzes – April 2011
- Governing body: The Royal Parks

Listed Building – Grade I
- Official name: Queen Victoria Memorial
- Designated: 5 February 1970
- Reference no.: 1273864

The Victoria Memorial is a monument to Queen Victoria, located at the end of The Mall in London, by the sculptor Sir Thomas Brock. Designed in 1901, it was unveiled on 16 May 1911, though it was not completed until 1924. It was the centrepiece of an ambitious urban planning scheme, which included the creation of the Queen's Gardens to a design by Sir Aston Webb, and the refacing of Buckingham Palace (which stands behind the memorial) by the same architect.

Like the earlier Albert Memorial in Kensington Gardens, commemorating Victoria's consort, the Victoria Memorial has an elaborate scheme of iconographic sculpture. The central pylon of the memorial is of Pentelic marble, and individual statues are in Lasa marble and gilt bronze. The memorial weighs 2,300 tonnes (about 2535 short tons) and is 32 m (104 ft) in diameter. In 1970 it was listed at Grade I.

== History ==
=== Proposal and announcements ===
King Edward VII suggested that a joint Parliamentary committee should be formed to develop plans for a Memorial to Queen Victoria following her death. The first meeting took place on 19 February 1901 at the Foreign Office, Whitehall. The first secretary of the committee was Arthur Bigge, 1st Baron Stamfordham. Initially these meetings were behind closed doors, and the proceedings were not revealed to the public. However the Lord Mayor of London, Sir Joseph Dimsdale, publicly announced that the committee had decided that the memorial should be "monumental".

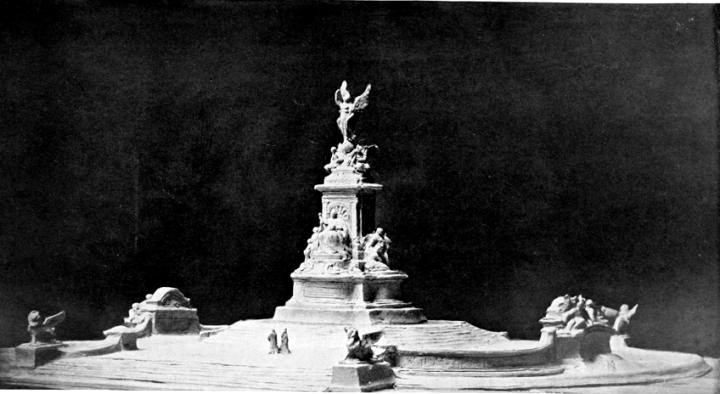
The original sketch model created by Thomas Brock of the finalised design of the Victoria Memorial

Reginald Brett, 2nd Viscount Esher, the secretary of the committee, submitted the proposal to the King on 4 March 1901. A number of sites were suggested, and the King visited both Westminster Abbey and the park near the Palace of Westminster. Several ideas were rumoured at this time, including an open square in The Mall near to the school Duke of York Column, and a memorial located in Green Park.

On 26 March the decision was announced to locate the memorial outside Buckingham Palace and slightly shorten The Mall. It was estimated that the work would cost £250,000 and decided that there would be no grant given by the Government to the construction. Once the site was selected, a competition was conducted for the design. Five architects were chosen to develop designs. This phase lasted until the beginning of July 1901, when the committee selected its primary choice for the construction and took it to the King for approval. It was announced on 21 October 1902 that Thomas Brock had been chosen as the designer. The expectation was that the memorial would cost £200,000.

=== Funding and construction ===
Funding for the memorial was gathered from around the British Empire as well as the public. The Australian House of Representatives granted a £25,000 contribution for the construction on 17 October 1905. The New Zealand Government submitted a cheque for £15,000 towards the fund. By October 1901 some £154,000 had been gathered for the construction of the memorial. During 1902 a number of tribes from the west coast of Africa sent goods to be sold, with the proceeds going towards the fund. Alfred Lewis Jones had arranged for these items to be brought from Africa to Liverpool free of charge on his ships.

Following the public and national donations towards the funds, there was more money collected than was necessary for the construction of the Victoria Memorial. Funds were therefore diverted towards the construction of Admiralty Arch at the other end of The Mall, and a redevelopment to clear a path directly from that road into Trafalgar Square. Sir Aston Webb was put in charge of this project; he built the Arch so economically that enough money was left over to re-front the entirety of Buckingham Palace, a job that was completed in 13 weeks due to the pre-fabrication of the new stonework.

The initial preparatory stage was to re-route the road and modify The Mall. Brock hoped that work on constructing the memorial itself could be started at some point in 1905. The lower half of the memorial was revealed to the public on 24 May 1909. Thousands of people visited it on the first day.

=== Dedication and inauguration ===
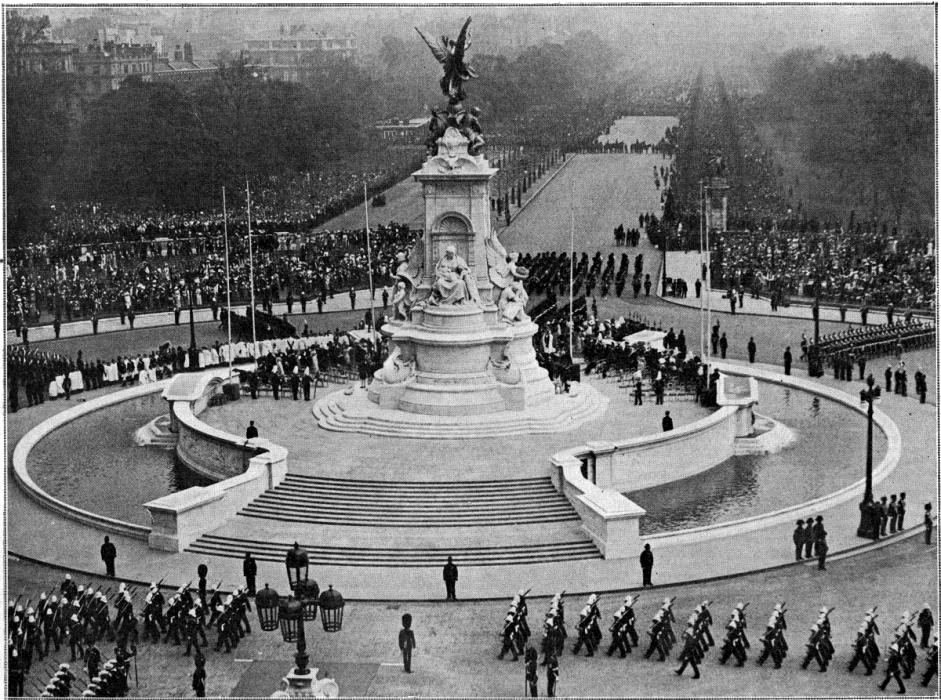
The memorial's unveiling ceremony

Following a practice ceremony on 11 March, in the presence of Prince Arthur, Duke of Connaught and Strathearn, the late queen's last surviving son, the dedication ceremony took place on 16 May 1911, presided over by King George V. His first cousin, Wilhelm II of Germany, was also present. These two were the senior grandsons of Victoria, and arrived, together with their families, in royal procession. Also in attendance were a large number of Members of Parliament, and representatives of various armed forces.

In his role as Home Secretary, Winston Churchill carried the text of the speeches. Lord Esher addressed the King and the gathered crowd, explaining the history of the memorial. The King replied to this, referring to his involvement in the development of the monument to his grandmother. He talked of the impact of Queen Victoria and of her popularity with the public. In total, the ceremony went on for thirty minutes. Following this, it was revealed to the press that the King had decided that the sculptor of the memorial, Thomas Brock, was to be knighted.

=== Later uses ===
As part of the celebrations of the Golden Jubilee of Elizabeth II, the Victoria Memorial (along with areas in Green Park and Buckingham Palace) was used as a platform for a fireworks display which lasted fourteen minutes with a total of two and three-quarter tonnes of fireworks used. In addition, water jets were added to the fountains in the Victoria Memorial, which fired water 40 feet (12 m) up into the air. This display followed a concert held in the Palace forecourt.

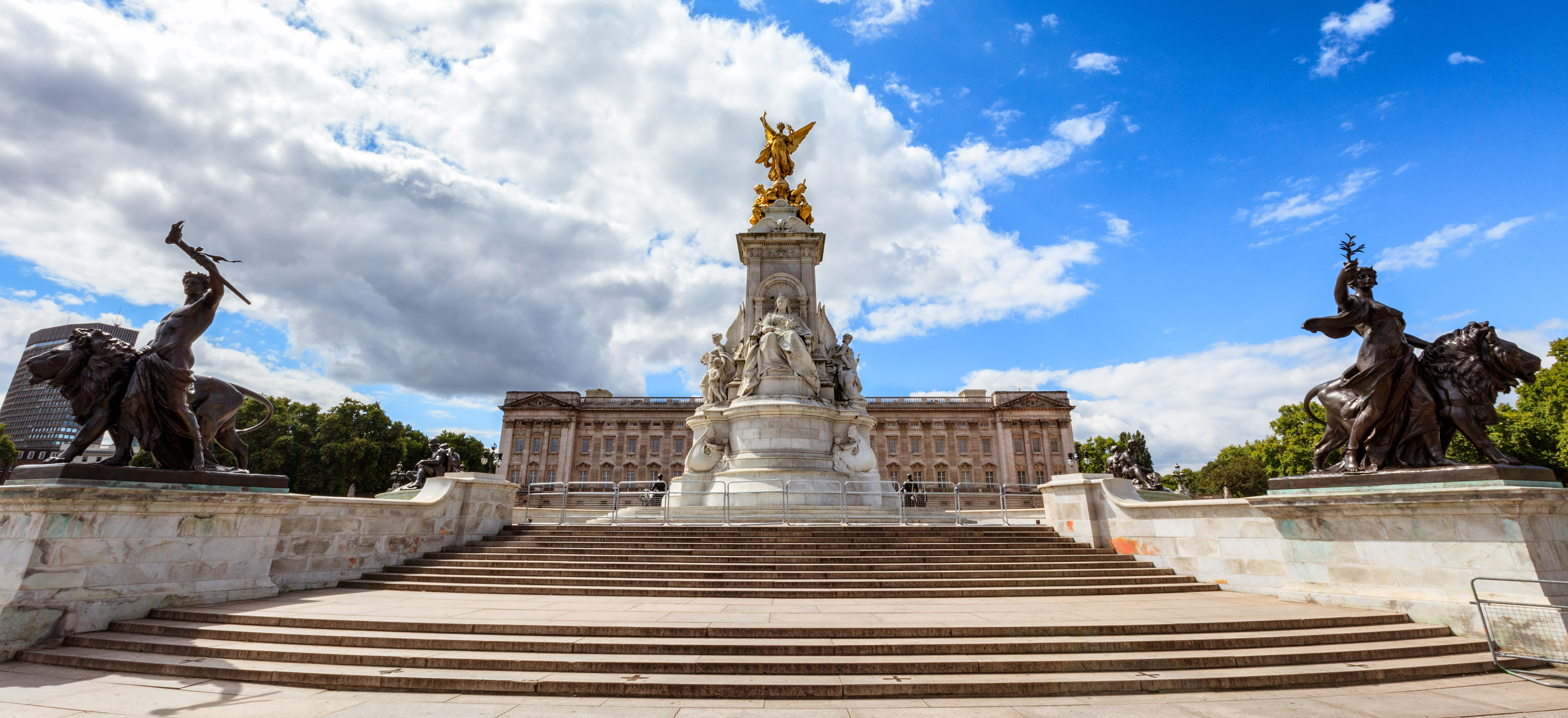
The Victoria Memorial with Buckingham Palace in the background

It was announced in February 2012 that the Victoria Memorial would form the centrepiece of the stage for Queen Elizabeth II's Diamond Jubilee Concert on 4 June that year. Platforms designed by Mark Fisher were built around the memorial at a cost of £200,000, and were constructed in two weeks. A number of performers appeared from across the sixty years of Queen Elizabeth II's reign, including organiser Gary Barlow, Tom Jones, Elton John, Cliff Richard, Jessie J, Madness, Dame Shirley Bassey and Paul McCartney. Tickets were free and allocated by public ballot; and in addition to being seen live by the 10,000 fans in attendance, the event was broadcast by the BBC and highlights were shown in the United States on ABC.

Later in 2012, the memorial marked the end of "Our Greatest Team Parade" on 10 September 2012. This parade celebrated the successes of the British teams at the 2012 Summer Olympics and Paralympics. There were 21 floats holding a total of around 800 athletes, and it was estimated that around a million members of the public cheered them on. The area from Admiralty Arch to the Victoria Memorial down the Mall was reserved for ticket holders. After the arrival at the Victoria Memorial, there was a flypast by helicopters of the Royal Air Force, as well as a British Airways jet and a flight of the Red Arrows. During the games, the Mall and the Victoria Memorial had been used as the finishing point for the Marathon, as well as being on the triathlon route.

== Description ==
At the top of the central pylon stands a gilded bronze Winged Victory, standing on a globe and with a victor's palm in one hand. Beneath her are personifications of Constancy, holding a compass with its needle pointing true north, and Courage, holding a club. Beneath these, on the eastern and western sides, are two eagles with wings outspread, representing Empire. Below these, statues of an enthroned Queen Victoria (facing The Mall) and of Motherhood (facing Buckingham Palace), with Justice (facing north-west towards Green Park) and Truth (facing south-east). These were created from solid blocks of marble, with Truth being sculpted from a block weighing 40 tonnes.

Brock described the symbolism of the memorial, saying that it was devoted to the "qualities which made our Queen so great and so much beloved." He added that the statue of the Queen was placed to face towards the city, while flanked by Truth and Justice as he felt that "she was just and that she sought the truth always and in circumstances", while the Motherhood was to represent her "great love for her people".

At the four corners of the monument are massive bronze figures with lions, representing Peace (a female figure holding an olive branch), Progress (a nude youth holding a flaming torch), Agriculture (a woman in peasant dress with a sickle and a sheaf of corn) and Manufacture (a blacksmith in modern costume with a hammer and a scroll). The self-bases of the last two groups are inscribed THE GIFT OF NEW ZEALAND. At nearly 25 metres (82 ft) tall, the Victoria Memorial remains the tallest monument to a King or Queen in England. The whole sculptural programme has a nautical theme, much like the rest of The Mall (Admiralty Arch, for example). This can be seen in the mermaids, mermen and the hippogriff, all of which are suggestive of the United Kingdom's naval power.

The memorial is a grade I listed structure. Its architectural setting of formal gardens and gates was designed by Sir Aston Webb and has a separate Grade I listing.

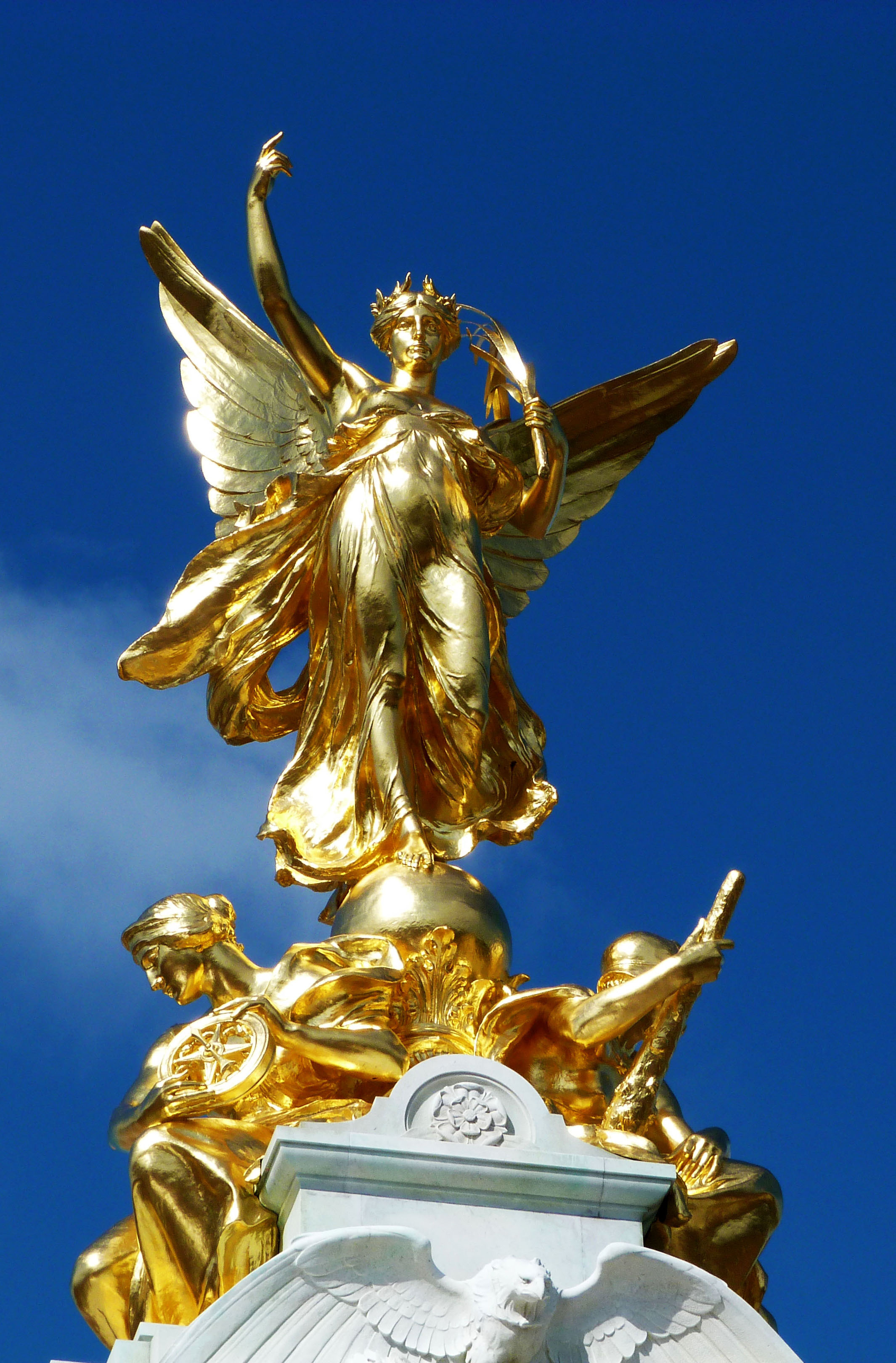
Gilded Winged Victory at the top of the memorial

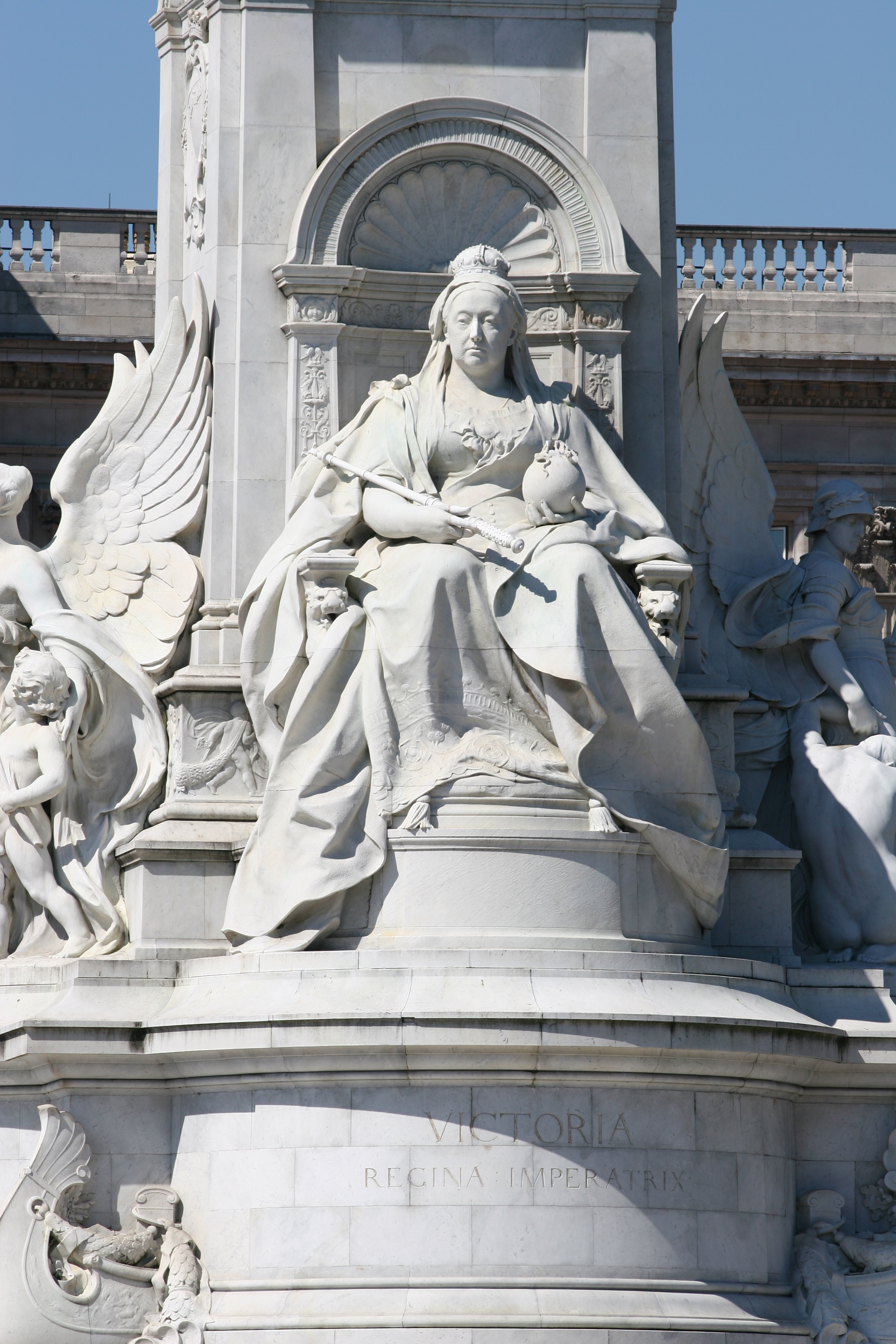
Statue of an enthroned Queen Victoria

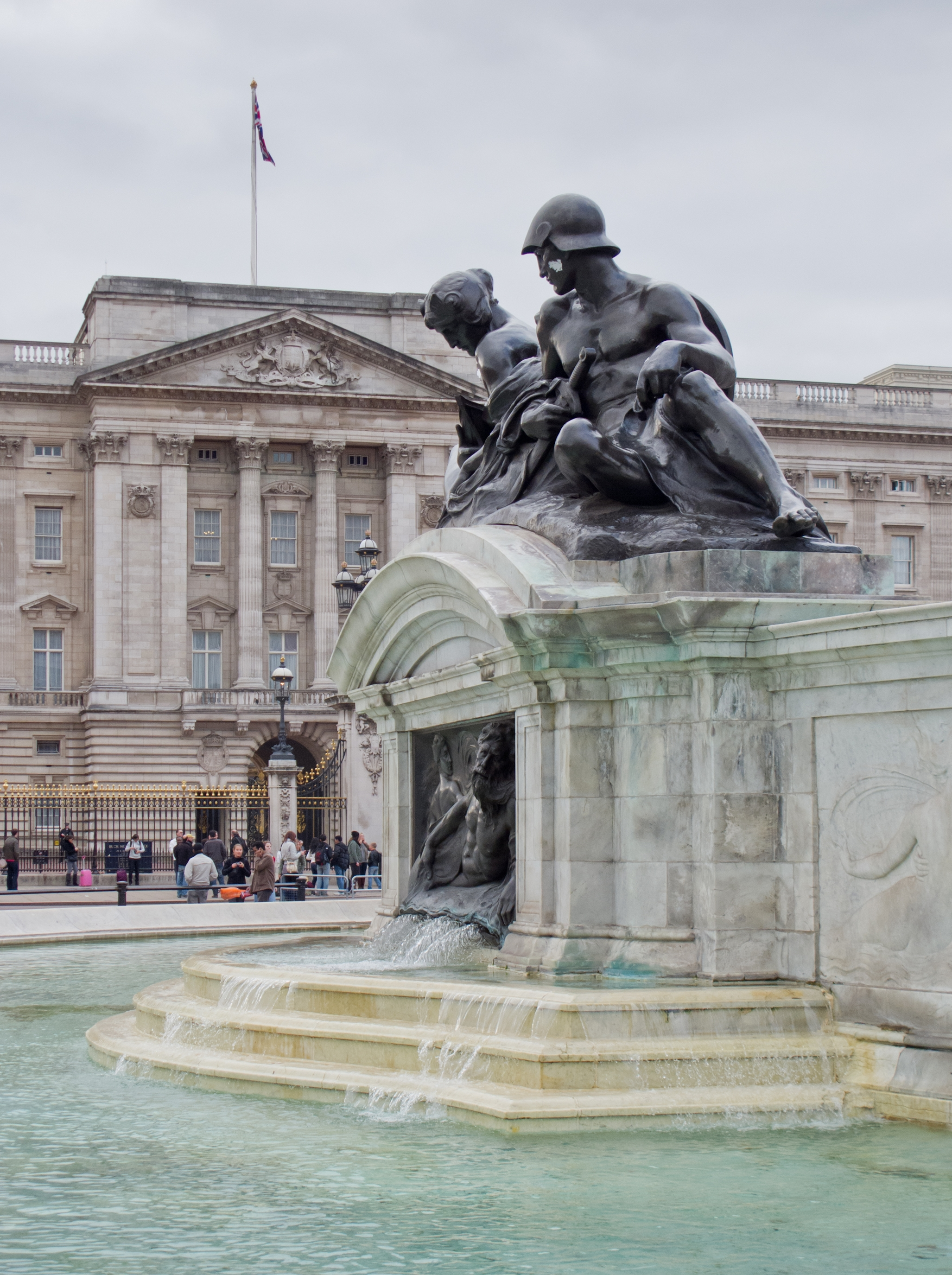
Fountain

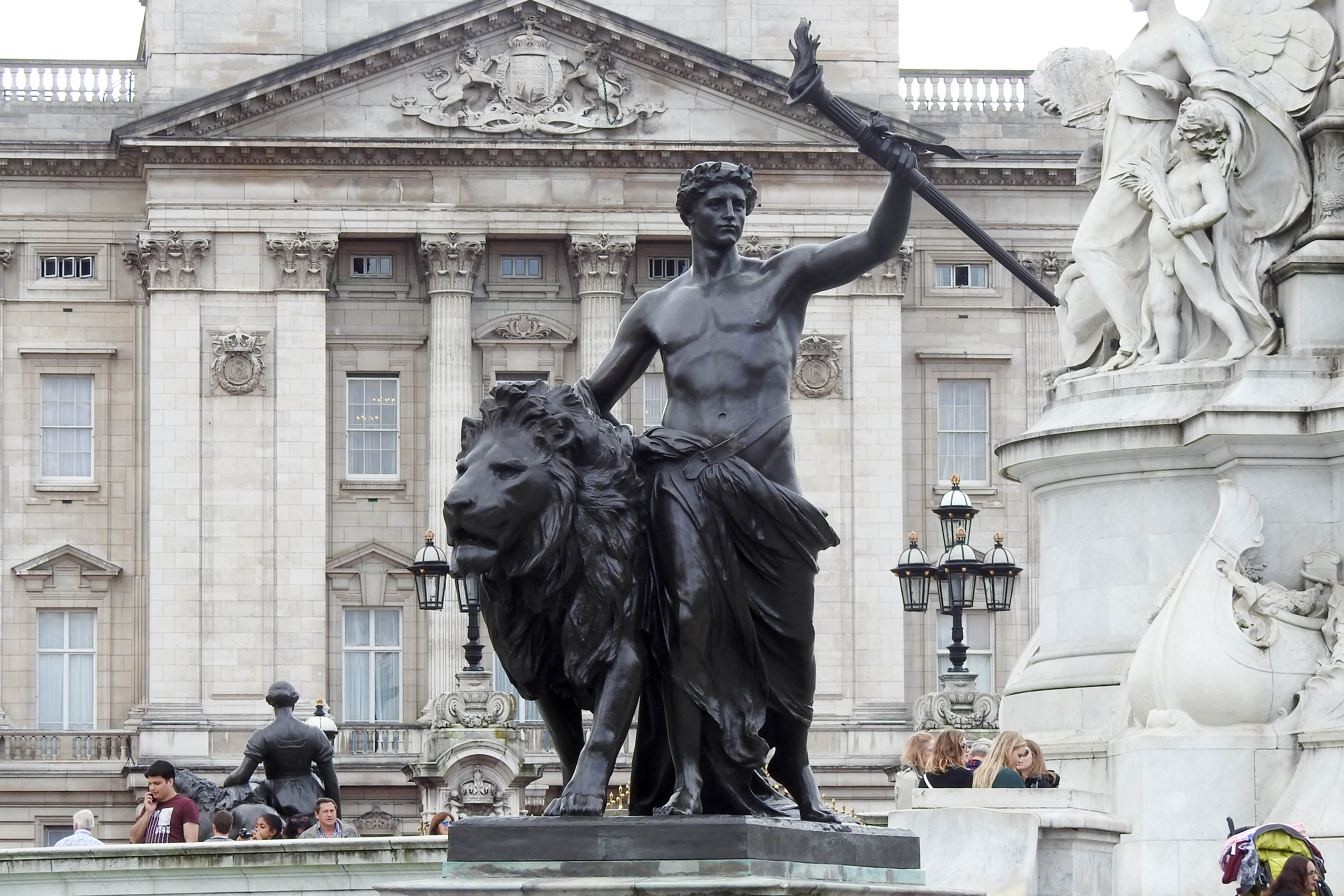
Progress, one of four bronze statues around the memorial

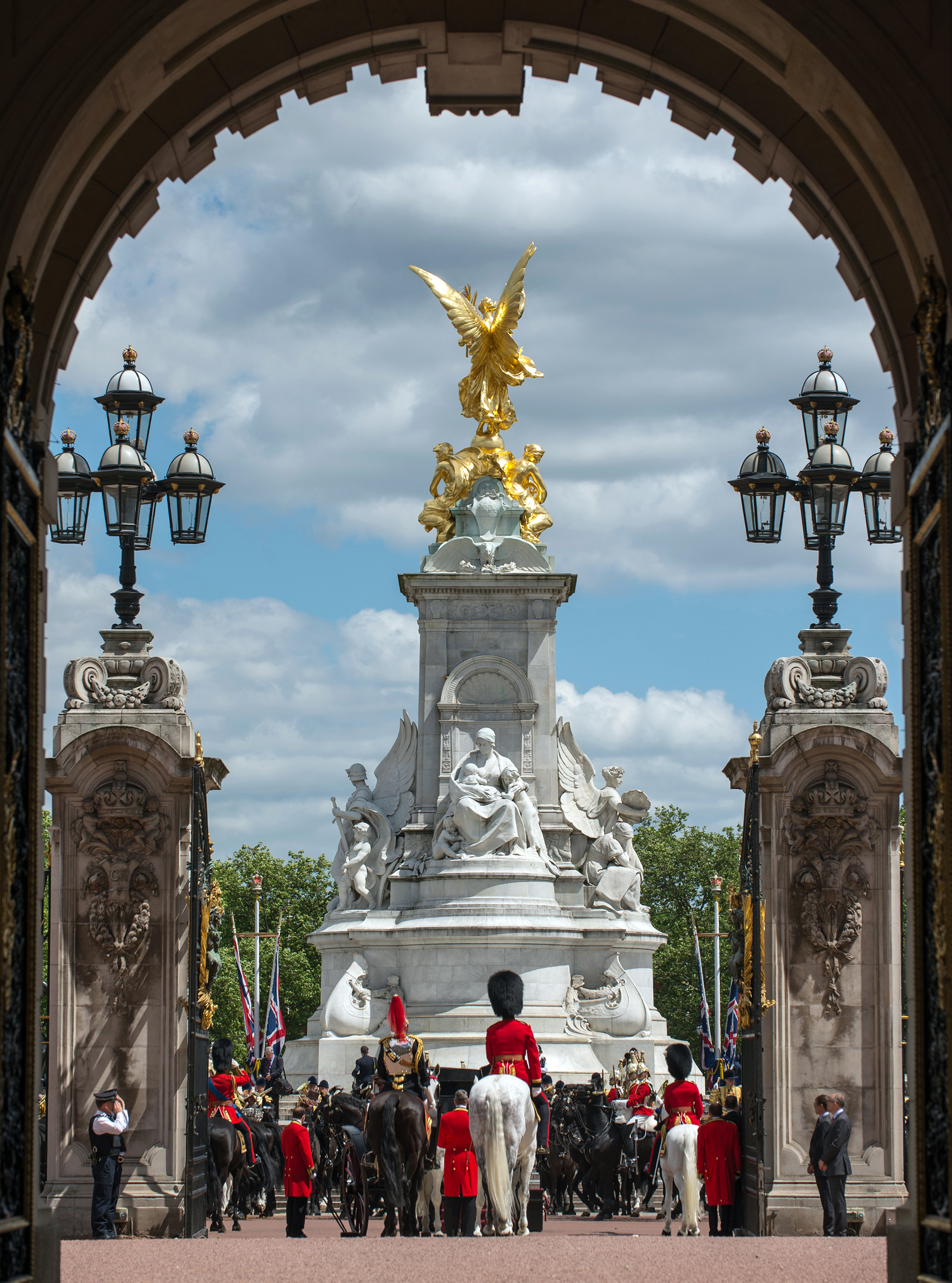
The Victoria Memorial from within Buckingham Palace

== See also ==
- Albert Memorial
- Royal Archives

== Bibliography ==
- Brock, Frederick (2012). Sankey, John (ed.). Thomas Brock: forgotten sculptor of the Victoria Memorial. Bloomington, Ind.: AuthorHouse. pp. 94–119. ISBN 978-1467883344.
- Sankey, John Anthony (2002). Thomas Brock and the Critics – An Examination of Brock's Place in the New Sculpture Movement (phd). Vol. 1. PhD Thesis: University of Leeds. pp. 210–52.
- Ward-Jackson, Philip (2011). Public Sculpture of Historic Westminster: Volume 1. Public Sculpture of Britain. Vol. 14. Liverpool: Liverpool University Press. ISBN 978-1846316623.
