= Urn =

Form of vase, often with a cover

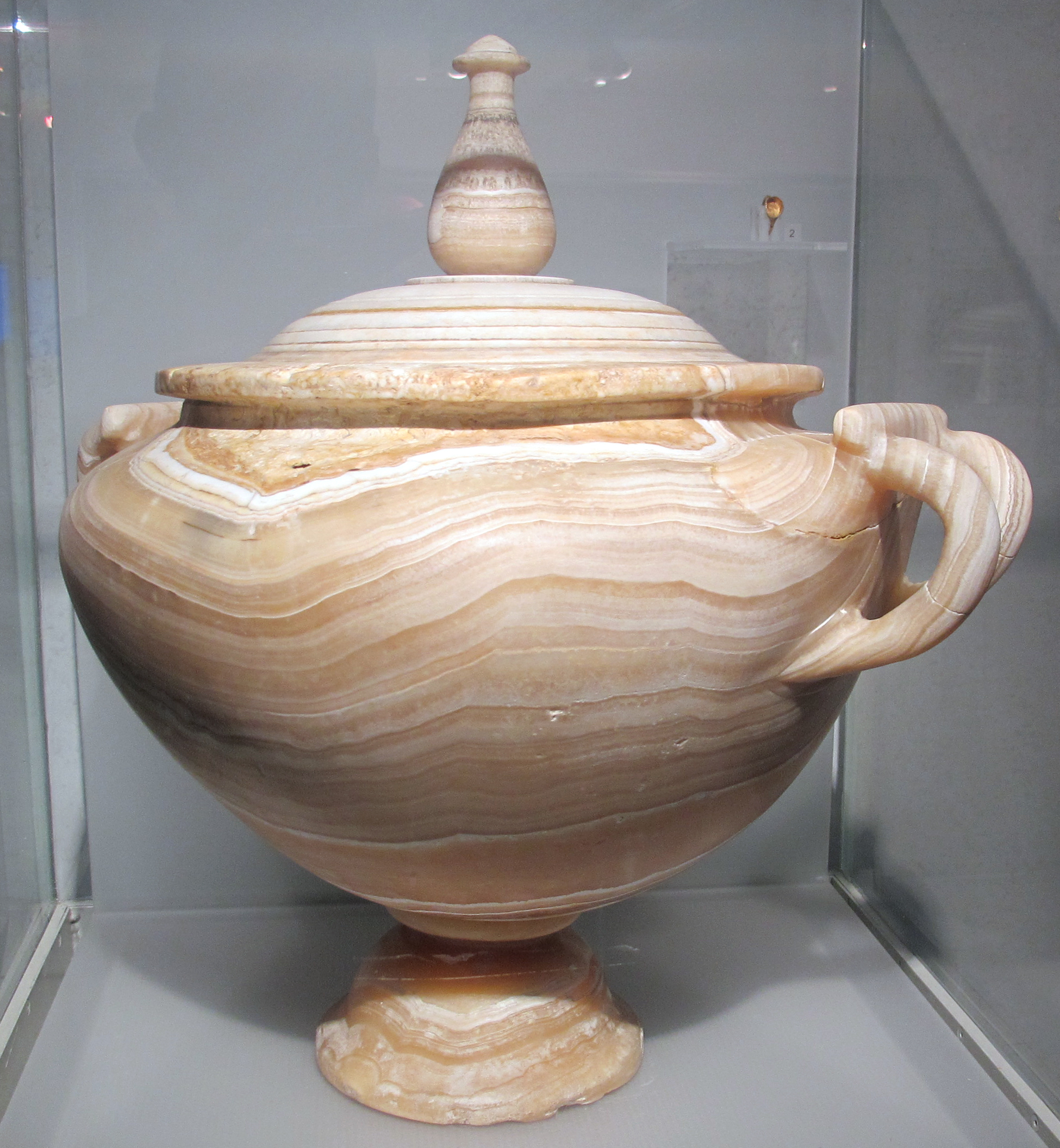
Ancient Roman urn made of alabaster

An urn is a vase, often with a cover, with a typically narrowed neck above a rounded body and a footed pedestal. Describing a vessel as an "urn", as opposed to a vase or other terms, generally reflects its use rather than any particular shape or origin. The term is especially often used for funerary urns, vessels used in burials, either to hold the cremated ashes or as grave goods, but is used in many other contexts.

Large sculpted vases are often called urns, whether placed outdoors, in gardens or as architectural ornaments on buildings, or kept inside. In catering, large vessels for serving tea or coffee are often called "tea-urns", even when they are metal cylinders of purely functional design.

Urns are also a common reference in thought experiments in probability wherein marbles or balls of different colors are used to represent different results and the urn represents the "container" of the whole set of possible states.

== Funerary ==
Funerary urns (also called cinerary urns and burial urns) have been used by many civilizations. After death, corpses are cremated, and the ashes are collected and put in an urn. Pottery urns, dating from about 7000 BC, have been found in an early Jiahu site in China, where a total of 32 burial urns are found, and other early finds are in Laoguantai, Shaanxi. There are about 700 burial urns unearthed over the Yangshao (5000–3000 BC) areas consisting of more than 50 varieties of forms and shapes. The burial urns were used mainly for children, but also sporadically for adults.

The Urnfield culture (c. 1300 BC – 750 BC), a late Bronze Age culture of central Europe, takes its name from its large cemeteries of urn burials. These are visible throughout Villanovan necropolises (c. 900-700 BC) in Etruria, located in Central Italy. The discovery of a Bronze Age urn burial in Norfolk, England, prompted Sir Thomas Browne to describe the antiquities found. He expanded his study to survey burial and funerary customs, ancient and current, and published it as Hydriotaphia or Urn Burial (1658).

In ancient Greece, cremation was usual, and the ashes were typically placed in a painted Greek vase. In particular, the lekythos, the shape of vase, was used for holding oil in funerary rituals. Romans placed the urns in a niche in a collective tomb called a columbarium (literally, dovecote). The interior of a dovecote usually has niches to house doves. Cremation urns were also commonly used in early Anglo Saxon England, and in many Pre-Columbian cultures.

In some later European traditions, a king's heart, and sometimes other organs, could be placed in one or more urns upon his death, as happened with King Otto of Bavaria in 1916, and buried in a different place from the body, to symbolize a particular affection for the place by the departed.

In the modern funeral industry, cremation urns of varying quality, elaborateness, and cost are offered, and urns are another source of potential profit for an industry concerned that a trend toward cremation might threaten profits from traditional burial ceremonies. Biodegradable urns are sometimes used for both human and animal burial. They are made from eco-friendly materials such as recycled or handmade paper, salt, cellulose or other natural products that are capable of decomposing back into natural elements, and sometimes include a seed intended to grow into a tree at the site of the burial.

Besides the traditional funeral or cremation ashes urns, it may also be possible to keep a part of the ashes of the loved one or beloved pet in keepsake urns or ash jewellery, although this might be banned in some localities as the law of certain countries may prohibit keeping any human remains in a private residence. It is even, in some places, possible to place the ashes of two people in so-called companion urns. Cremation or funeral urns are made from a variety of materials such as metals, ceramics, porcelain, and occasionally glass.

== Figural ==
A figural urn is a style of vase or larger container where the basic urn shape, of either a classic amphora or a crucible style, is ornamented with figures. These may be attached to the main body, forming handles or simply extraneous decorations, or may be shown in relief on the body itself.

== Trophies and ornaments ==
The Ashes, the prize in the biennial Test cricket competition between England and Australia, are contained in a miniature urn.

Urns are a common form of architectural detail and garden ornament. Well-known ornamental urns include the Waterloo Vase.

In Neoclassical furniture, an urn was a large wooden vase-like container which was usually set on a pedestal on either side of a side table. This was the characteristic of Adam designs and also of Hepplewhite's work. Sometimes they were "knife urns", where the top lifted off, and cutlery was stored inside. Urns were also used as decorative turnings at the cross points of stretchers in 16th and 17th century furniture designs. The urn and the vase were often set on the central pedestal in a "broken" or "swan's" neck pediment. "Knife urns" placed on pedestals flanking a dining-room sideboard were an English innovation for high-style dining rooms of the late 1760s. They went out of fashion in the following decade, in favour of knife boxes that were placed on the sideboard.

== Tea urn ==
A tea urn is a heated metal container traditionally used to brew tea or boil water in large quantities. They are not usually found in domestic use. Like a samovar it has a small tap near the base for extracting either tea or hot water. Unlike an electric water boiler, tea may be brewed in the vessel itself, although they are equally likely to be used to fill a large teapot.

== Gallery ==
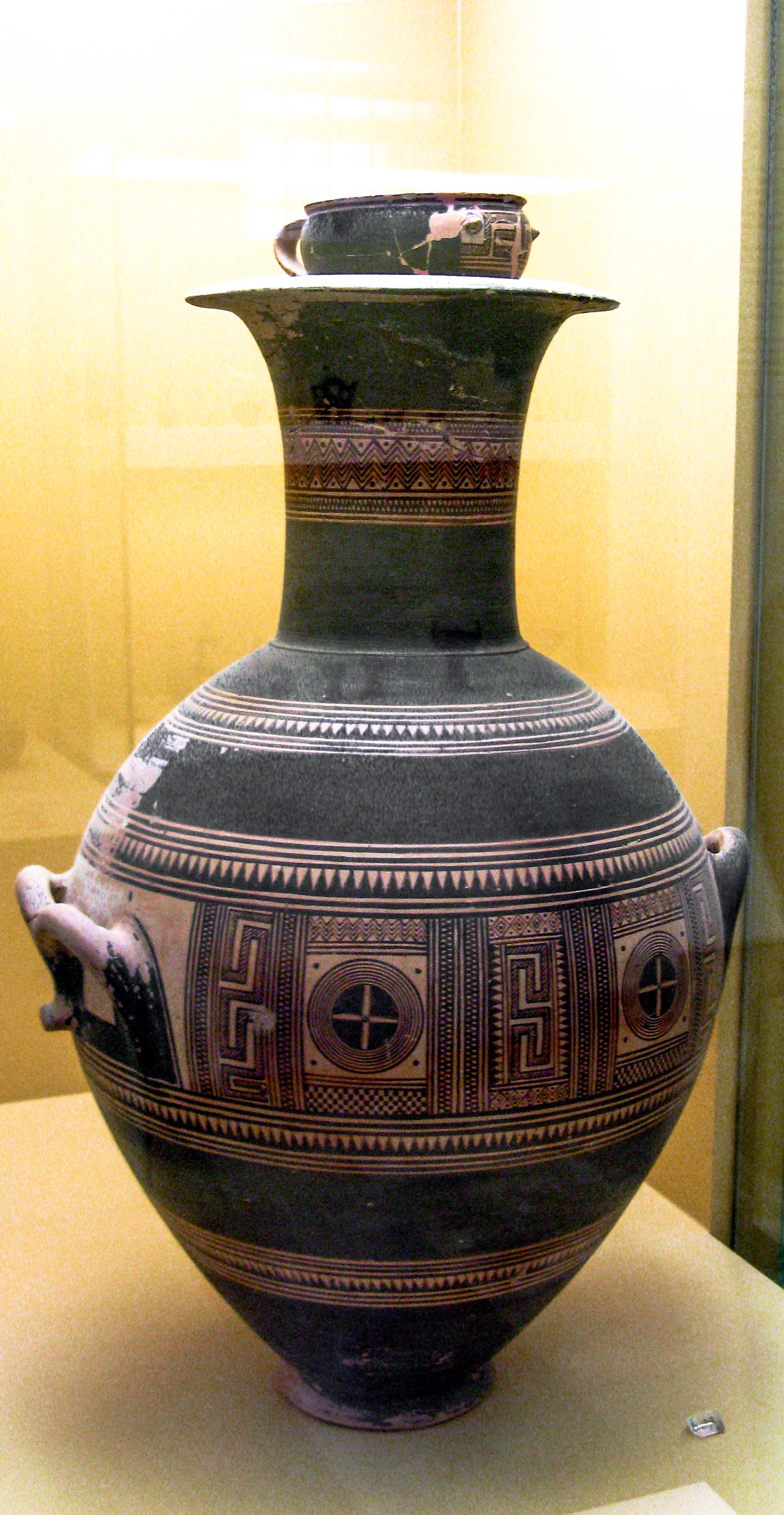
Ancient Greek cremation urn c. 850 BC

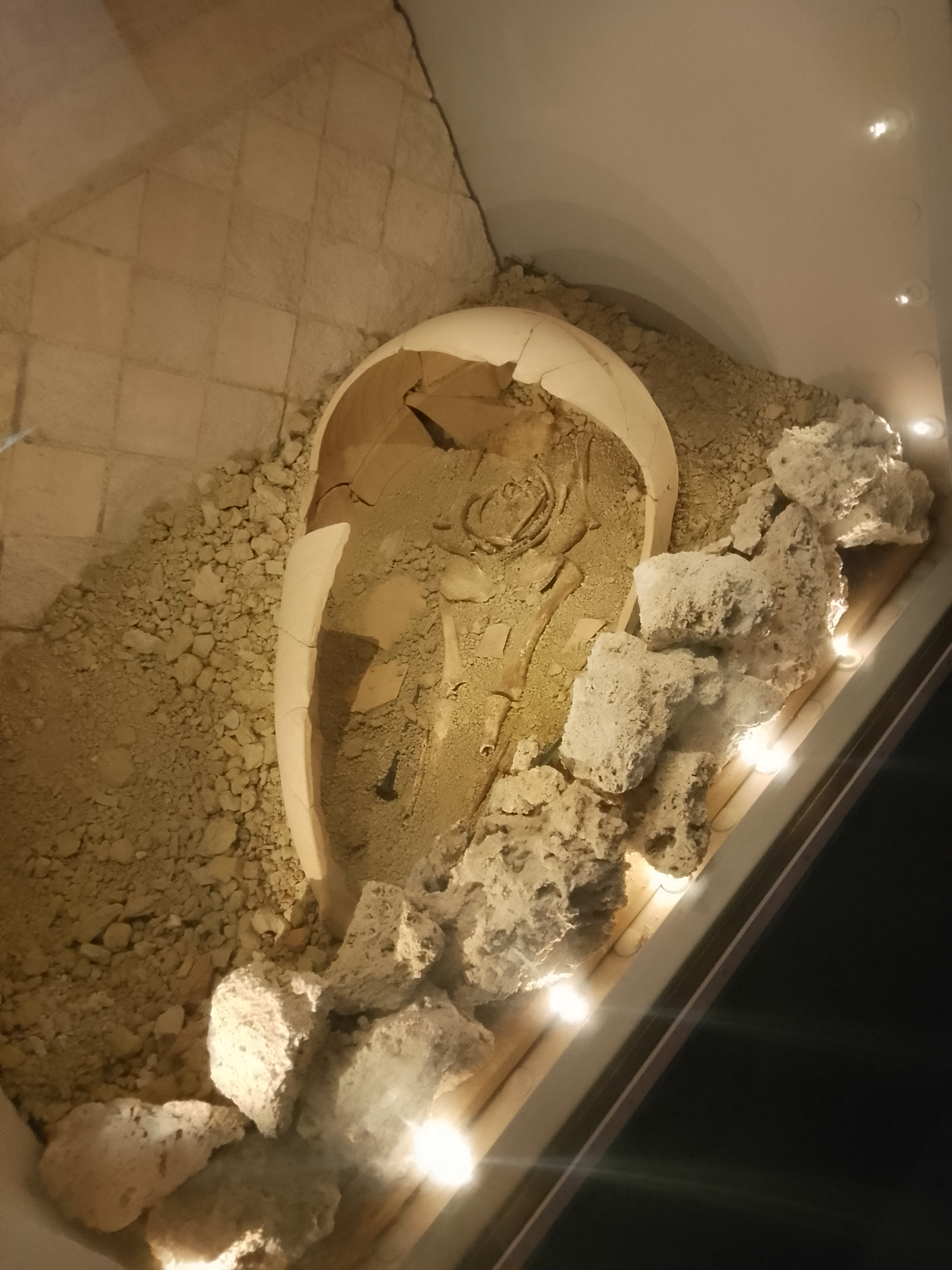
Child funerary vase, Civitella archaeology museum in Chieti, Italy

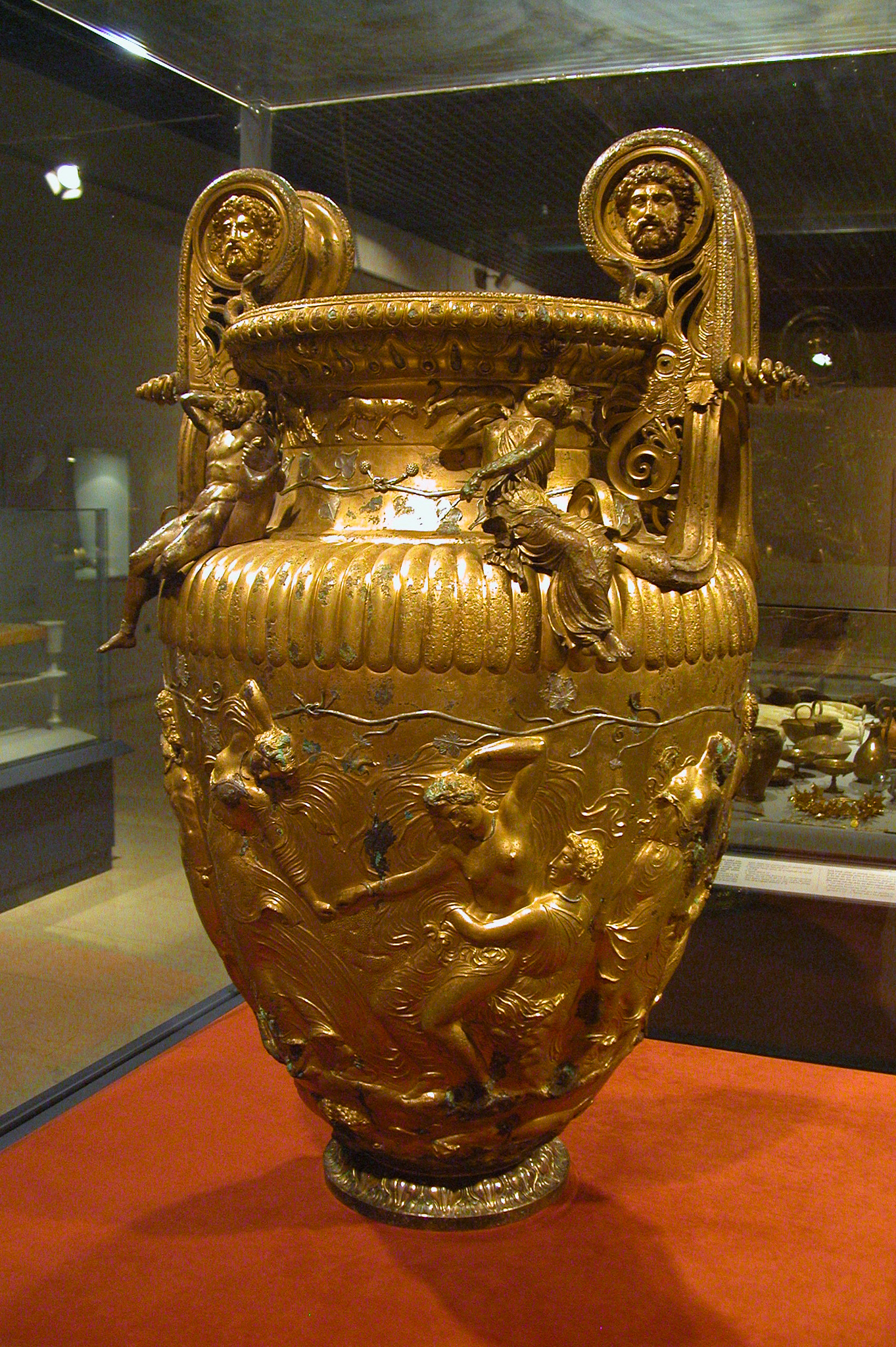
The Derveni Krater, one of very few large Ancient Greek bronze vessels to survive

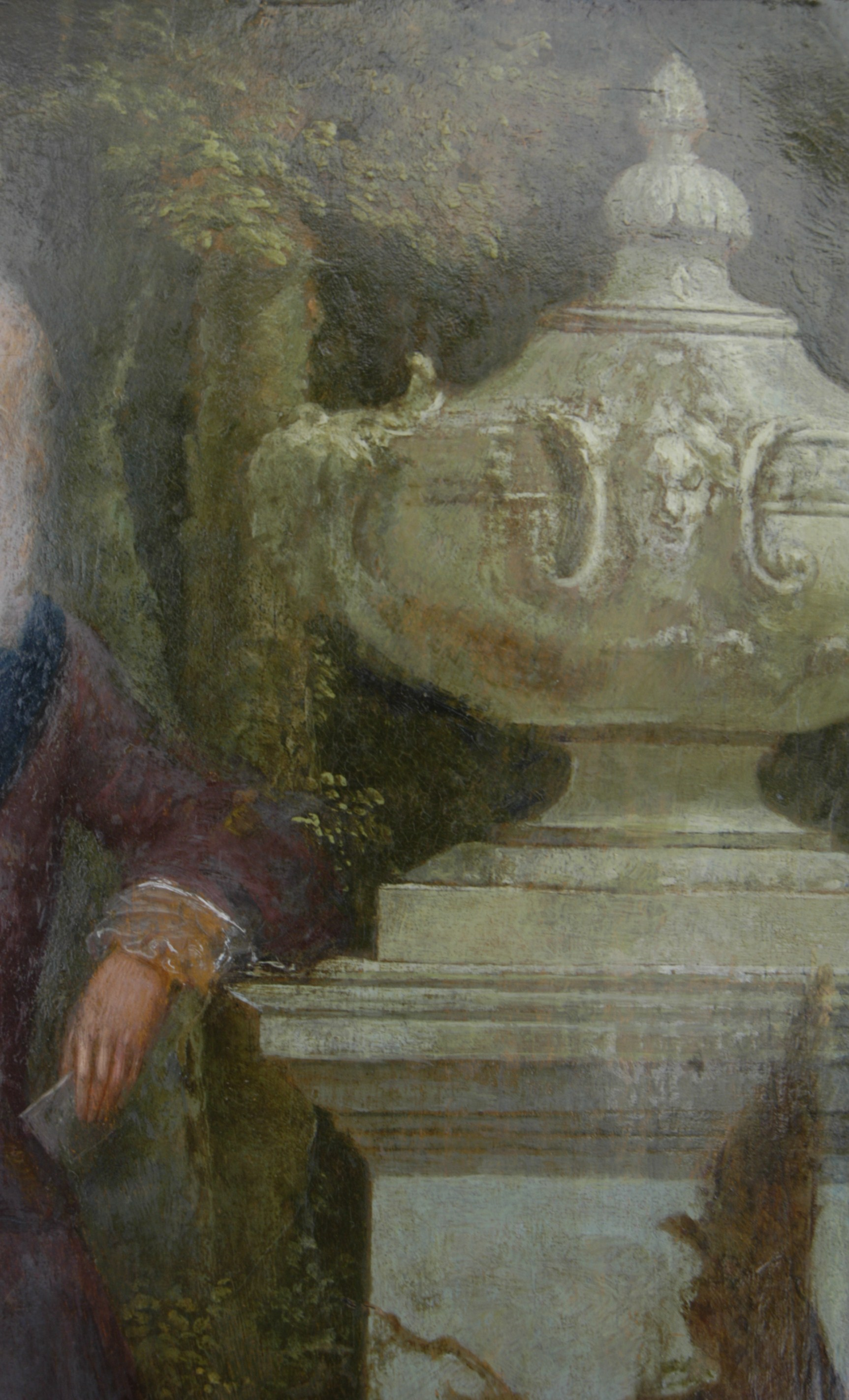
A 1720s depiction of a fantasy garden urn; a detail of a larger English painting of a Knight of the Garter

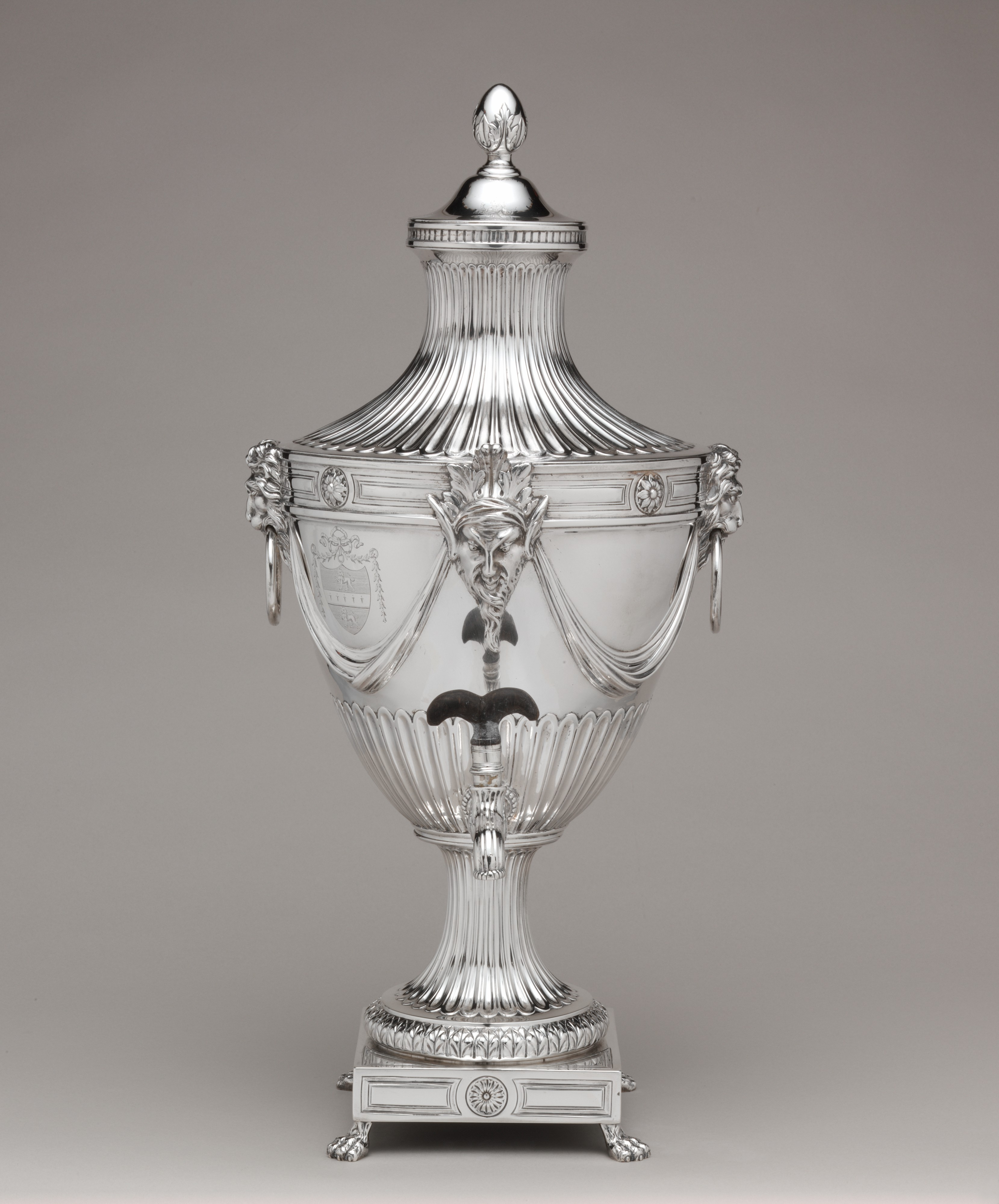
An ornate tea urn (late 18th century)

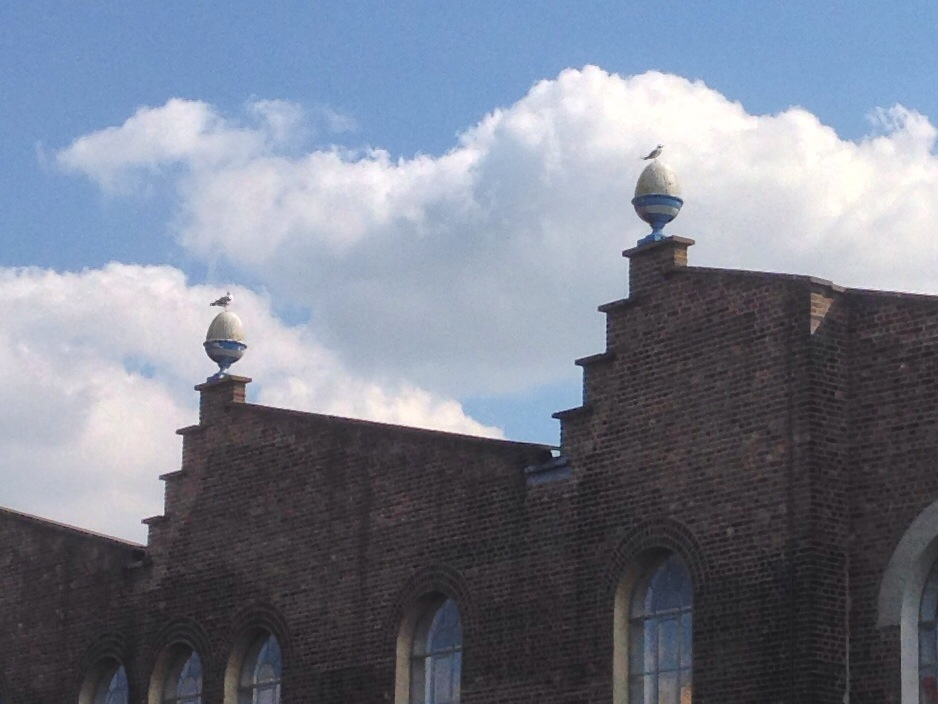
A possible postmodern reinterpretation of the urn, the eggcup finials atop the TV-am building, London, by Terry Farrell, 1982

== See also ==
- Bridge spouted vessel
- Columbarium
- Crematorium
- Funeral home
- Pithos
- Viewlogy
