= Statue of the Duke of Bedford =

Statue in Bloomsbury, London

Coordinates: 51.5212°N 0.1254°W

Francis Russell, 5th Duke of Bedford
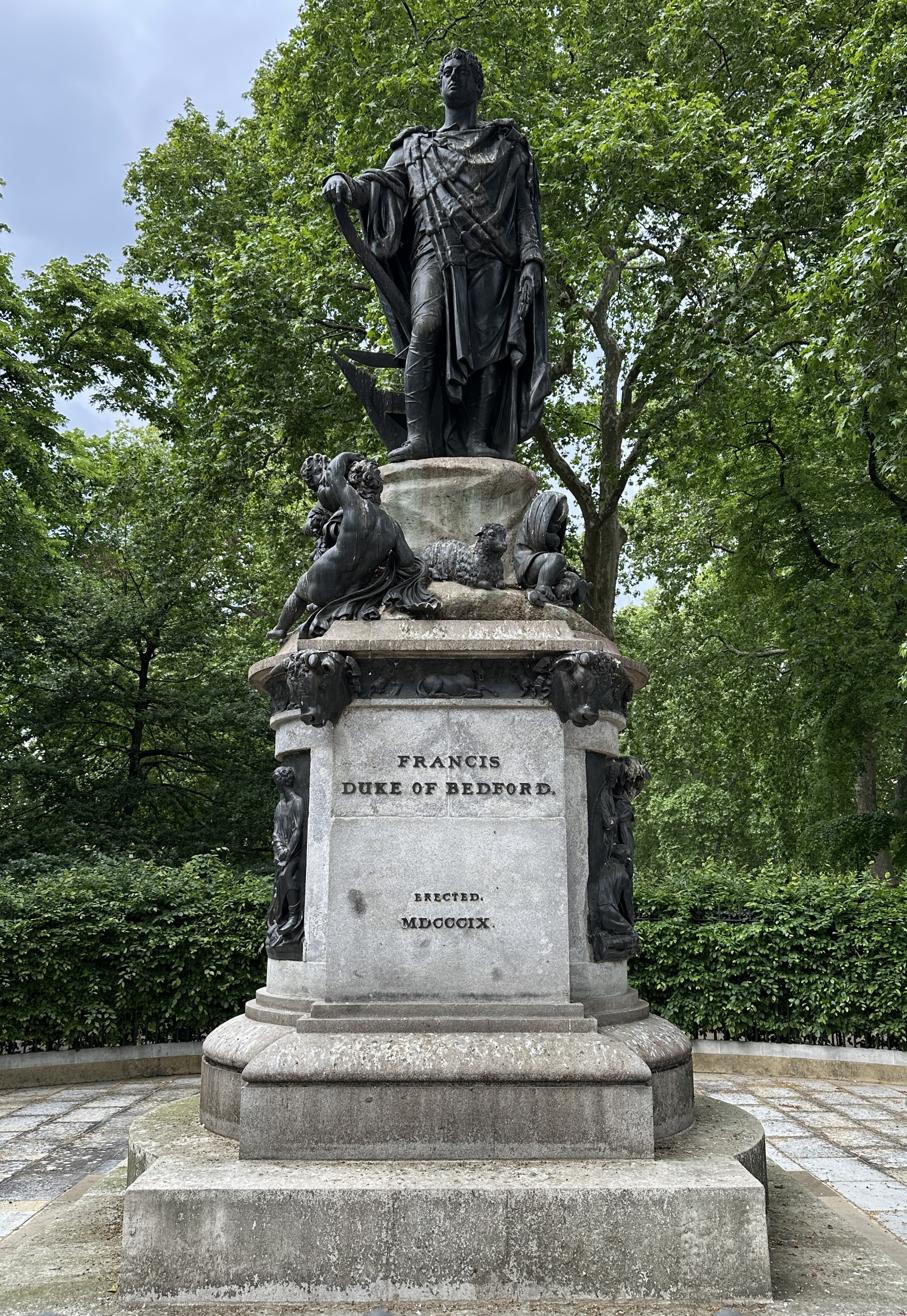
- Artist: Richard Westmacott
- Completion date: 1809
- Subject: Francis Russell, 5th Duke of Bedford
- Location: London

Listed Building – Grade II
- Official name: Statue of Francis Russell 5TH Duke of Bedford
- Designated: 24 October 1951
- Reference no.: 1246153

A statue of Francis Russell, 5th Duke of Bedford, by Sir Richard Westmacott stands at the southern end of Russell Square in Bloomsbury, London. Erected in 1809, it is a Grade II listed building.

== Background ==
The Duke was an agriculturist and landowner from the Russell family after whom the square was named. He was a Whig politician, as was his uncle Charles James Fox whose statue in Bloomsbury Square by the same sculptor, erected seven years later, faces the Duke's statue across Bedford Place.

The 5th Duke of Bedford was also known for his work in agriculture; he was a founding member of the Board of Agriculture and first president of the Smithfield Club. He was committed to experimentation with agricultural techniques, and under him his country seat at Woburn Abbey became a centre for agricultural meetings.

== Description ==
The statue shows the Duke in Roman attire. It also alludes to his great interest in agriculture, showing him with a plough and farm animals which surround the plinth, together with four cherubs representing each of the four seasons.
