= Buckingham Palace Garden =

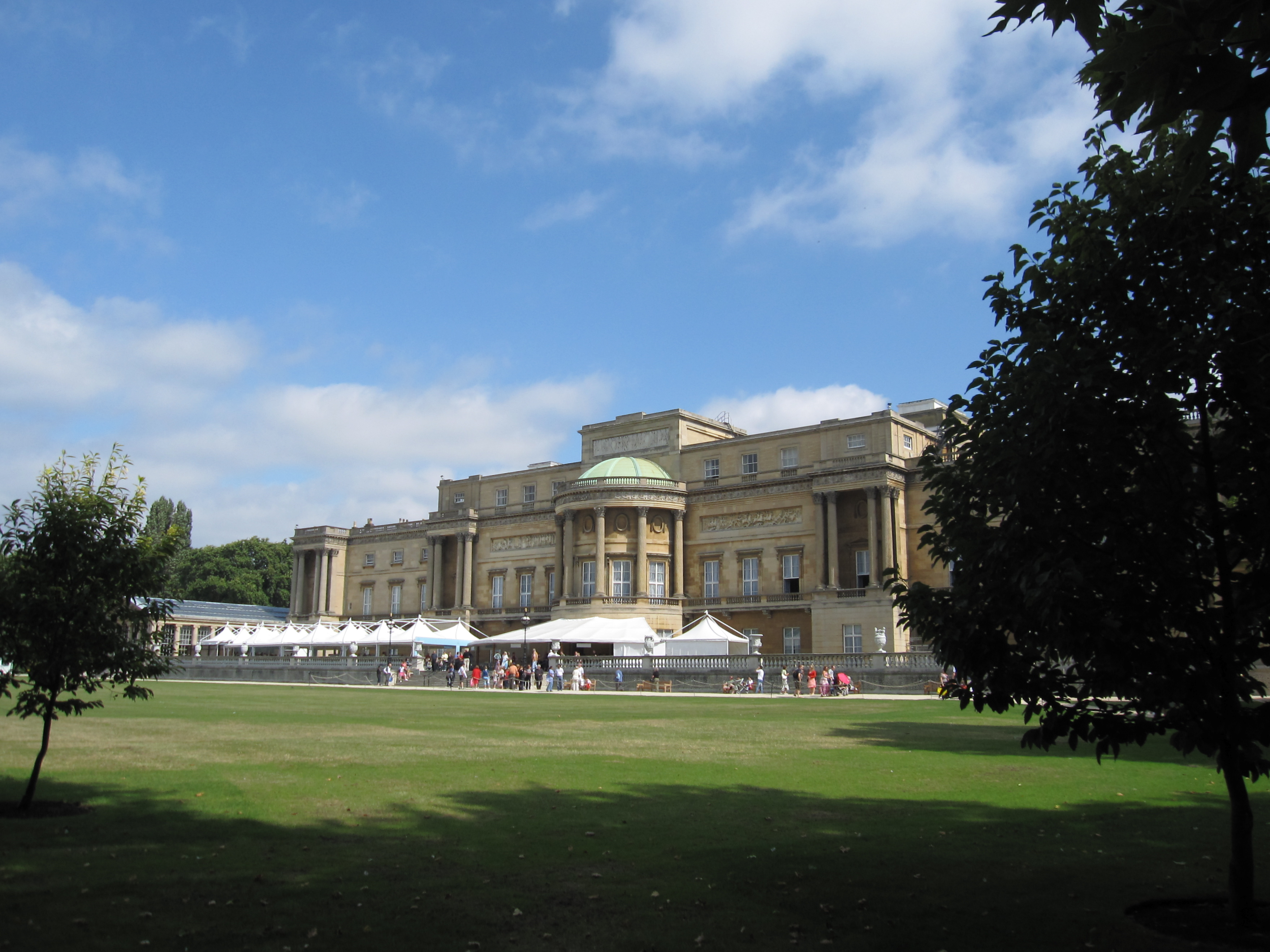
- The west front of Buckingham Palace from the garden

- Location within Central London
- 51.5018°N 0.1484°W
- Type: Garden
- Location: London

Site notes
- Architect(s): Henry Wise, William Townsend Aiton
- Governing body: Household of Charles III

National Register of Historic Parks and Gardens
- Official name: Buckingham Palace Garden
- Designated: 1 October 1987
- Reference no.: 1000795

Listed Building – Grade I
- Official name: North Screen to Buckingham Palace Forecourt with Gateway to Gardens
- Designated: 5 February 1970
- Reference no.: 1273844

Listed Building – Grade I
- Official name: Summer House in Buckingham Palace Garden
- Designated: 5 February 1970
- Reference no.: 1239210

Listed Building – Grade I
- Official name: The Waterloo Vase in Buckingham Palace Garden
- Designated: 5 February 1970
- Reference no.: 1239244

Listed Building – Grade I
- Official name: Buckingham Palace Boundary Walls Enclosing Grounds walls to Buckingham Palace Gardens
- Designated: 5 February 1970
- Reference no.: 1239209

Buckingham Palace Garden is a large private park attached to the London residence of the British monarch. It is situated to the rear (west) of Buckingham Palace, occupying a 17-hectare (42-acre) site in the City of Westminster and forms the largest private garden in London. It is bounded by Constitution Hill to the north, Hyde Park Corner to the west, Grosvenor Place to the south-west, and the Royal Mews, King's Gallery, and Buckingham Palace itself to the south and east.

The royal connection to the site of the garden dates from 1609 when James I purchased four acres of land "near to his palace of Westminster for the planting of mulberry trees". The garden covers much of the area of the former Goring Great Garden, named after Lord Goring, occupant of one of the earliest grand houses on the site. In 1664 Goring's mansion, and the lease on the grounds, was bought by Henry Bennet, 1st Earl of Arlington. In 1674 the house was destroyed by fire and Arlington built a replacement, named Arlington House, on the site. This house was sold by Arlington's daughter to John Sheffield, Earl of Mulgrave. Created Duke of Buckingham and Normanby in 1703, Buckingham commissioned a new mansion for the site, named Buckingham House. His architect was William Talman and his builder William Winde. Similar attention was paid to the landscape, where Buckingham engaged Henry Wise to lay out an elaborate garden in the French style, with parterres and a central canal. In the late 18th century, Buckingham House was acquired by George III whose heir, George IV used John Nash to remodel the house which was renamed Buckingham Palace. Nash engaged William Townsend Aiton to implement designs for a new garden. Aiton's work forms the basis of the garden that exists today.

Buckingham Palace Garden is the setting for monarch's annual garden parties. In June 2002, Queen Elizabeth II invited the public into the garden for entertainment for the first time during her reign. As part of her Golden Jubilee Weekend thousands of Britons were invited to apply for tickets to Party at the Palace where the guitarist Brian May of the band Queen performed his God Save the Queen guitar solo on top of Buckingham Palace. This concert was preceded the previous evening by a Prom at the Palace. During the Queen's 80th birthday celebrations in 2006 the garden was the scene of Children's Party at the Palace.

The garden is Grade II* listed on the Register of Historic Parks and Gardens. The planting is varied and exotic, with a mulberry tree dating back to the time of James I. Notable features include a large 19th-century lake which was once graced by a flock of flamingoes, and the Waterloo Vase. There is also a summerhouse attributed to William Kent, a helicopter landing pad on the great lawn below the West Terrace, and a tennis court. Unlike the nearby Royal Parks of London, Buckingham Palace Garden is not usually open to the public. However, when the palace is open during August and September, visitors have access to part of the garden, which forms the exit, via a gift shop in a marquee, at the end of the tour.

== History ==
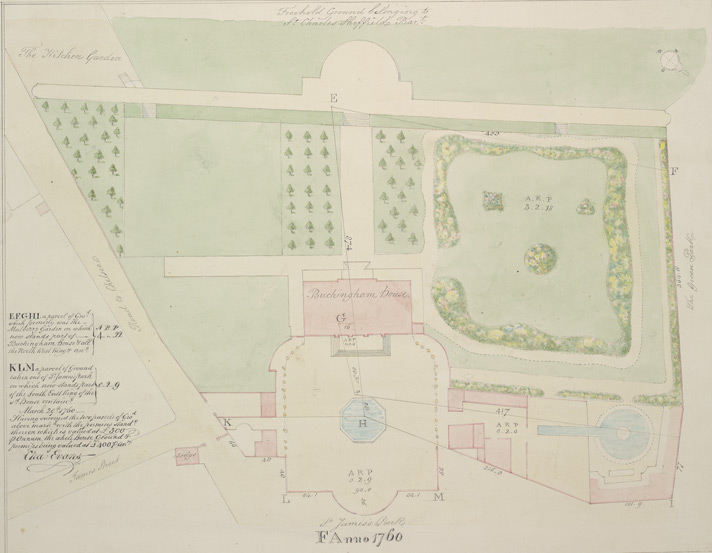
The grounds of Buckingham House in 1760, the future site of Buckingham Palace, showing the ornamental canal running westward, flanked by trees

The garden at Buckingham Palace was formed from that created for the palace's predecessor, Buckingham House. The landscape design for the earlier garden was by Henry Wise. He constructed an elaborate formal garden with a long central canal running south from the rear of the house. Wise was paid the substantial sum of £1,000 per year for his services. Subsequently, work was undertaken by Capability Brown, who planned more than was achieved. The garden was redesigned at the time of the palace rebuilding by William Townsend Aiton of Kew Gardens and John Nash for George IV. The great manmade lake was completed in 1828 and was supplied with water from the Serpentine Lake in Hyde Park.

Beyond the lake is an artificial rise, called The Mound, made partly from soil that was excavated to build the lake. It was constructed to obscure the view of the Royal Mews from the palace. During the Victorian era, Prince Albert had a pavilion built on the mound. Known as the Milton, or Comus Pavilion, it was decorated with scenes from John Milton's masque Comus, painted by some of the leading artists of the day. (Note: The artists employed by Prince Albert to undertake the decoration of the Comus Pavilion were Clarkson Frederick Stanfield, Thomas Uwins, Charles Robert Leslie, William Charles Ross, Charles Lock Eastlake, Daniel Maclise, William Dyce and Edwin Landseer.) Derelict after World War I, the pavilion was pulled down in 1928.

The garden is maintained by approximately eight full-time gardeners, with two or three part-timers. The trees include plane, Indian chestnut, silver maple, and a swamp cypress. In the south-west corner, there is a single surviving mulberry tree from the plantation installed by King James I of England when he unsuccessfully attempted to breed silkworms in the Mulberry Garden on the Buckingham Palace site. The garden now holds the UK's national collection of mulberry trees, housing some 40 varieties.

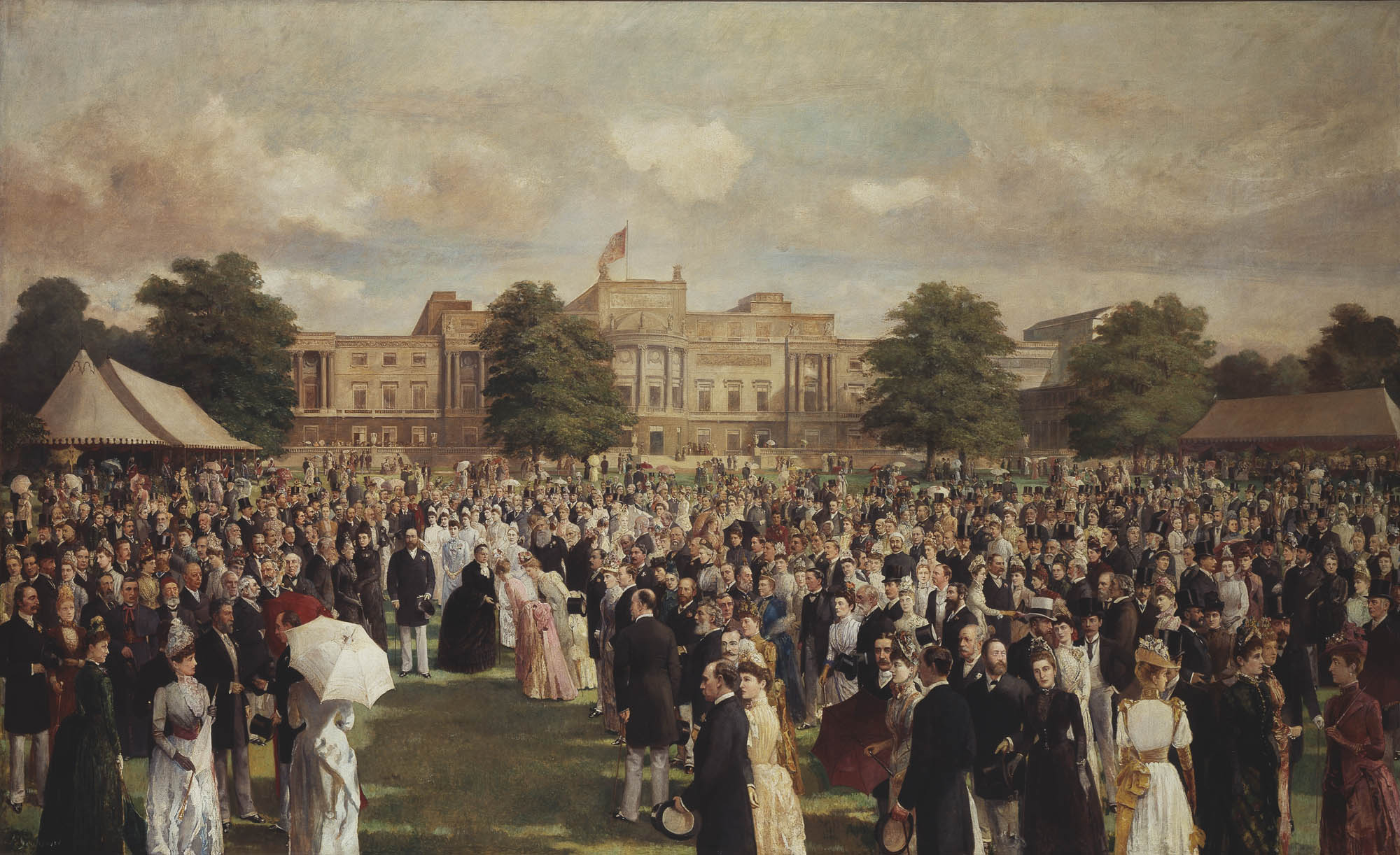
The garden party at Buckingham Palace for the Golden Jubilee of Queen Victoria, 20 June 1887

The garden is regularly surveyed for its moths by staff from the Natural History Museum, and occasionally visited by the Queen's swans. A tennis court was constructed in the garden in 1919 and, in the 1930s, the future George VI played Fred Perry on the court. In 2006 the garden was the site of the "Big Royal Dig" by the Time Team of archaeologists led by Tony Robinson. The results were televised, with some live streaming. Timed to help celebrate the 80th birthday of Queen Elizabeth II, this marked Time Team's 150th dig.

The garden is not generally open to the public but visitors to the palace during its summer opening exit through the garden. Private tours are occasionally available.

=== Garden parties ===
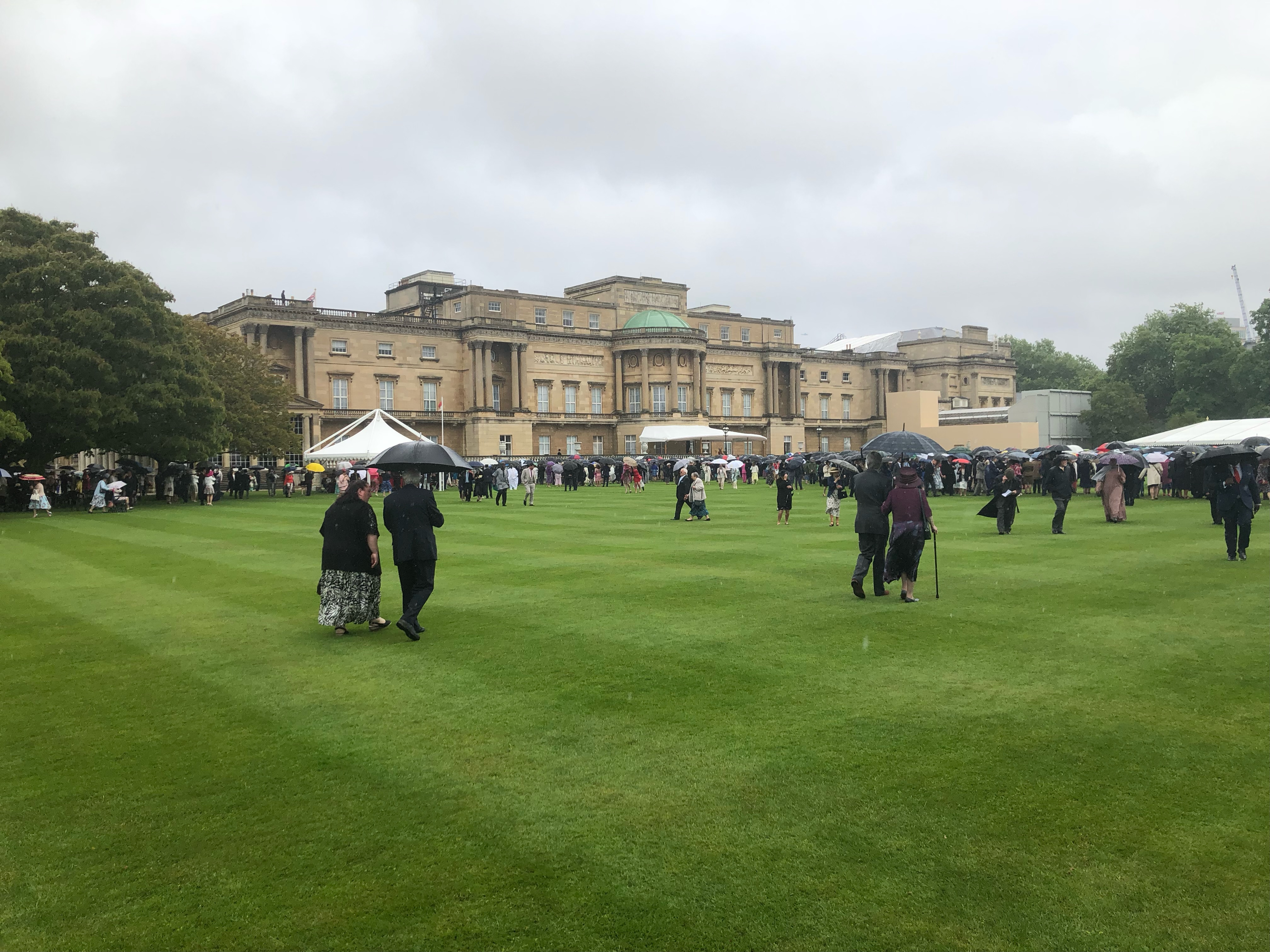
Buckingham Palace garden party – May 2022

The garden is the setting for the Royal Garden Parties held by the reigning monarch. Although earlier Royal owners had held entertainments in the garden, the tradition of large, formal, garden parties was established by Victoria, for whose Golden and Diamond Jubilees, two particularly lavish parties were held in 1887 and 1897. Three garden parties are held at Buckingham Palace, and one at the Palace of Holyroodhouse (in Scotland) each summer. The monarch also gives permission for additional garden parties to be held; in 2008, parties were held for the Centenary of the Royal Charter to the British Red Cross, the Territorial Army, the Not Forgotten Association and for those attending the Lambeth Conference. Some 30,000 guests attend the parties each year, which recommenced in 2022, after a two-year abeyance due to the COVID-19 pandemic. Nominations for invitations to the garden parties are made by the Lord-lieutenants, (Note: Lord-Lieutenants are the personal representatives of the king in each Lieutenancy area. These, generally but not exclusively, correspond to the traditional counties of the United Kingdom.) government departments, the armed forces, the Diplomatic corps and a range of charities and societies. The nominations, which are intended to acknowledge public service, are approved by the Lord Chamberlain, who then issues the invitations in the name of the king.

Guests take tea and sandwiches in marquees erected in the garden. (Note: Some 27,000 cups of tea, 20,000 sandwiches and 20,000 slices of cake are consumed at each garden party.) Just prior to 4.00 p.m. the king and accompanying members of the Royal Family emerge from the Bow Room in the palace, as a band plays the National Anthem. The royal party then process through ranks of assembled guests towards the Royal Tea Tent, greeting those previously selected for the honour. A second private tea tent is reserved for diplomatic guests, while all other attendees make use of the general tent. (Note: Roy Nash, in his study, Buckingham Palace: The Place and the People, notes that "the tea served in all three tents is the same".) Two military bands alternate in playing a "continuous supply of festive music".

== Description ==
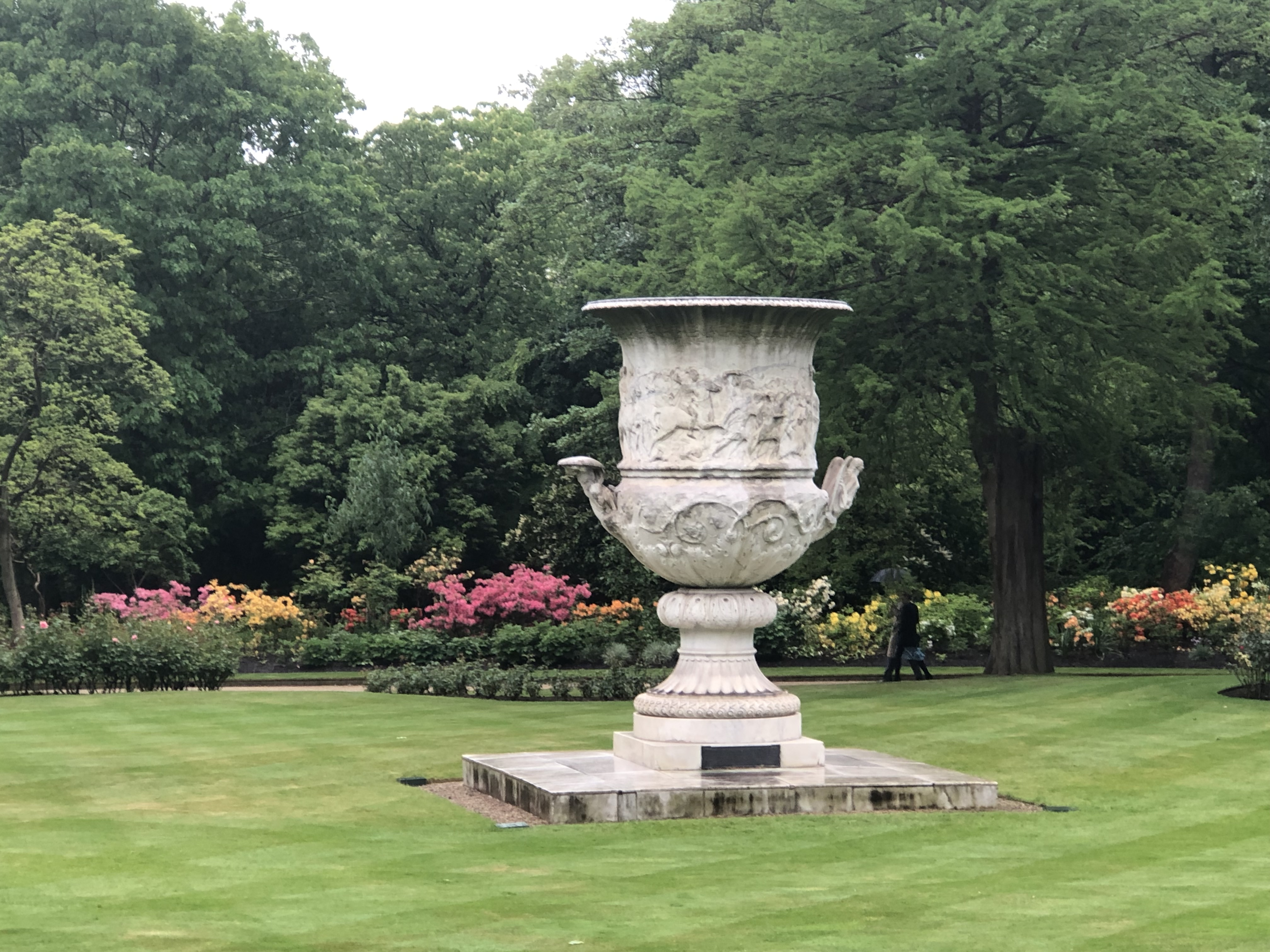
The Waterloo Vase

=== The site and the trees ===
The garden, the largest in London, covers 39 acres (16 ha) and contains more than 1,000 trees, 325 species of wild plants and 35 different species of birds. The largely-flat site forms a rough triangle with Buckingham Palace at the apex. The western (rear) facade opens on to a long terrace, the West Terrace, which overlooks a large lawn, known as the Main Lawn. Beyond the lawn is the lake. The whole is surrounded by a wall and, internally, by a gravel path which runs around the garden's perimeter, with branches diverting around the lawns, lake and island flowerbeds. The dominating species of tree is the London plane Platanus × hispanica. There are a large number of commemorative trees, planted to celebrate royal occasions, which continues a tradition begun by Queen Victoria and Prince Albert. 24 trees within the garden are designated as "Champion Trees" on the Tree Register of the British Isles.

=== Architectural features ===
The garden has a number of architectural features. Among the most notable is the Waterloo Vase, a great urn commissioned by Napoleon to commemorate his expected victories, which in 1815 was presented unfinished to the Prince Regent. After the King had had the base completed by sculptor Richard Westmacott, intending it to be the focal point of the new Waterloo chamber at Windsor Castle, it was adjudged to be too heavy for any floor (at 15 ft (4.6 m) high and weighing 15 tons). The National Gallery, to whom it was presented, finally returned it in 1906 to the sovereign, Edward VII. King Edward then solved the problem by placing the vase outside in the garden where it now remains. A pair of ornamental cranes which stand by the lake were presented to Edward when on a tour of India as Prince of Wales in 1875-6.

=== Summerhouse and statuary ===
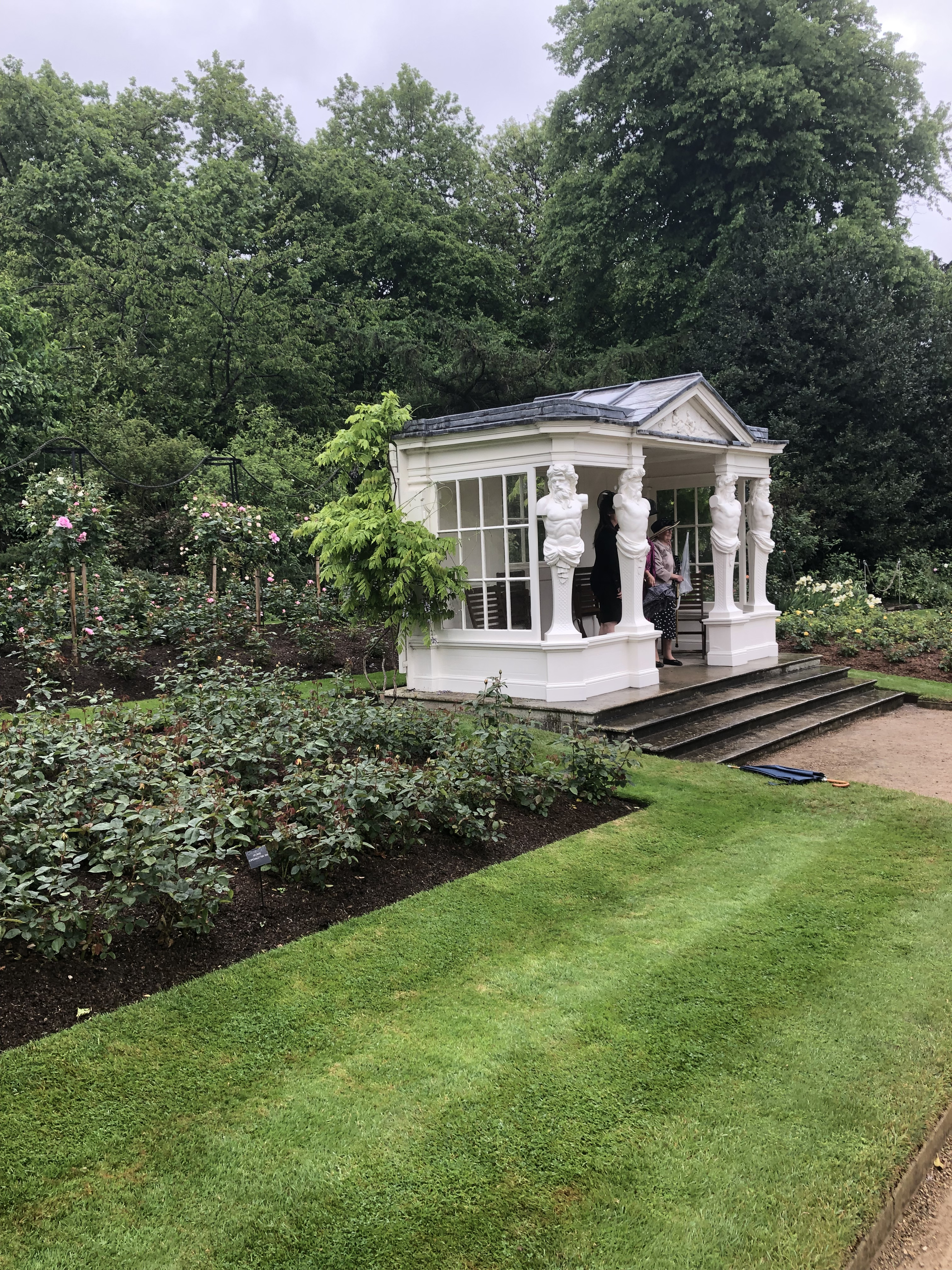
The summerhouse attributed to William Kent

Opposite the Waterloo Vase stands a summerhouse which was removed from the old Admiralty garden at the other end of The Mall. (Note: Bradley and Pevsner note that the summerhouse, which they do not attribute to William Kent, was reconstructed after suffering bomb damage in World War II.) The structure is in the form of a small temple, with a pediment supported by four Atlantes. Peter Coats, in his study of 1978, The Gardens of Buckingham Palace, notes stylistic similarities to the work of William Kent. Much of the statuary in the garden, including vases and urns on the West Terrace, was designed by Nash, and constructed in Coade Stone, a form of artificial stone popular in the Regency and Victorian periods.

=== Lake, Tennis Court, Lawn and Stonework ===
There is also a lake and a tennis court, the latter dating from 1919. The lake is 400 feet (120 m) long and 150 feet (46 m) across and used to be home to a colony of flamingo until they were killed by foxes. The lake was originally fed from The Serpentine in Hyde Park, but is now sourced from a bore hole in the garden. The water is aerated by a waterfall, installed by Elizabeth II and Prince Philip, to replace a cascade constructed by the Queen's parents, George VI and Queen Elizabeth. The large island in the lake houses four beehives where, since 1983, honey has been produced. Helicopters land on the great lawn in front of the West Terrace. The garden contains a number of examples of another type of artificial stonework, Pulhamite, including two bridges to the islands in the lake and a large rockery.

=== Critical views ===
Simon Bradley, in the 2003 revised edition of the Pevsner Buildings of England, London 6: Westminster, describes the garden at Buckingham Palace as "beautiful", noting particularly the "irregular lake and artful Picturesque planting". The design of the garden has also been criticised; suggesting that, after Wise, no major designer was employed, a writer for Country Life concluded that it lacked any of the features of a truly great garden, "originality, surprise, vista, architecture, statuary, planting", although they acknowledged the garden's utility as a "helicopter landing pad".

=== Listing designations ===
The garden is Grade II* listed on the Register of Historic Parks and Gardens of special historic interest in England. The Waterloo Vase and the Kent Summerhouse are Grade I listed structures. Structures on the perimeter of the garden which are also listed at Grade I include the surrounding boundary wall; the garden entrance screen to the front right of the palace, the screen to the Ambassadors' Court to the left and the main entrance to the Ambassadors' Court on Buckingham Palace Road; the wall enclosing the royal riding school, and the riding school itself; the Royal Mews; and two flanking lodges. A secondary section of the mews, and four lamp posts in front of the riding school are listed at Grade II.

== Gallery ==
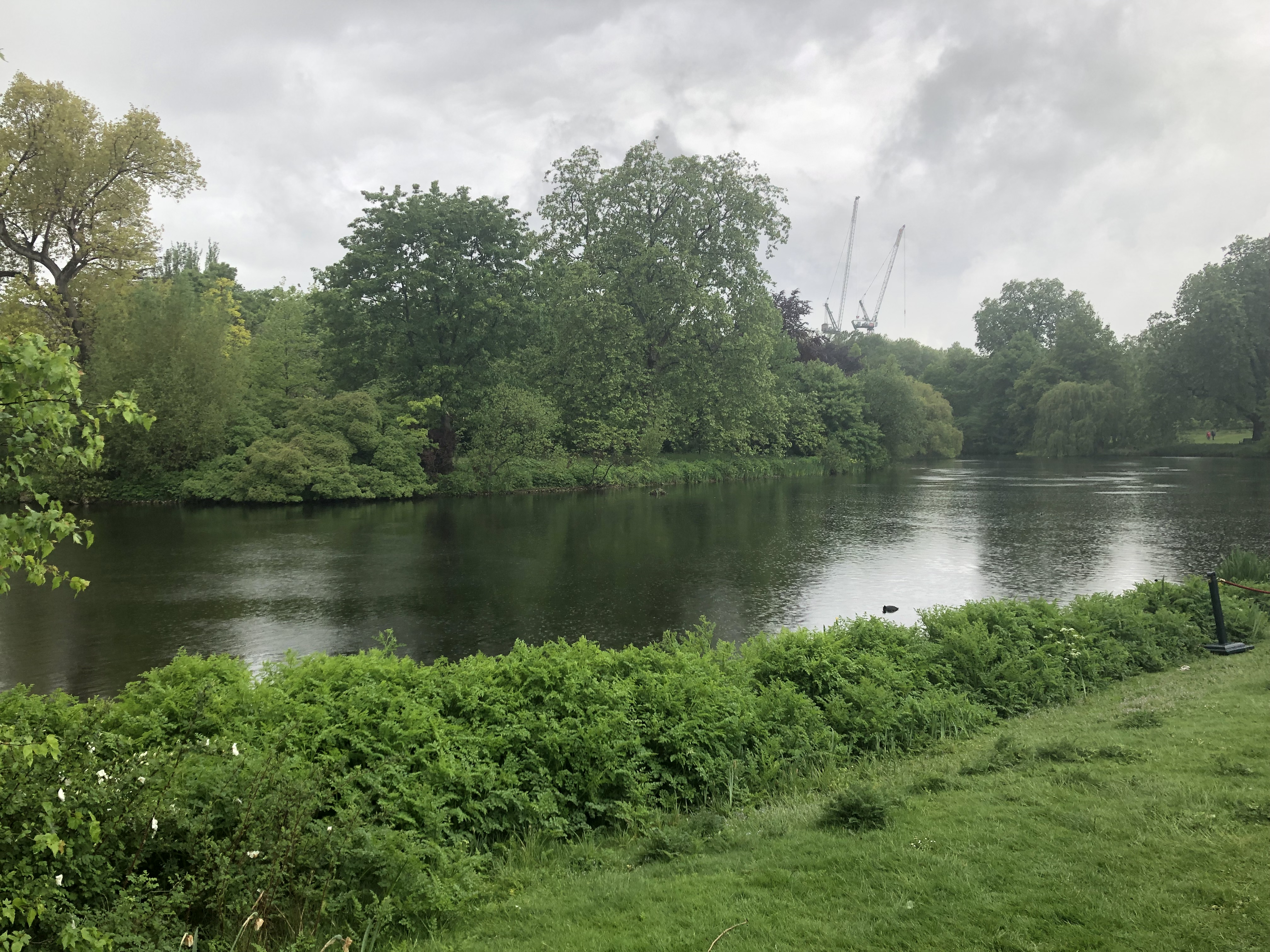
The lake

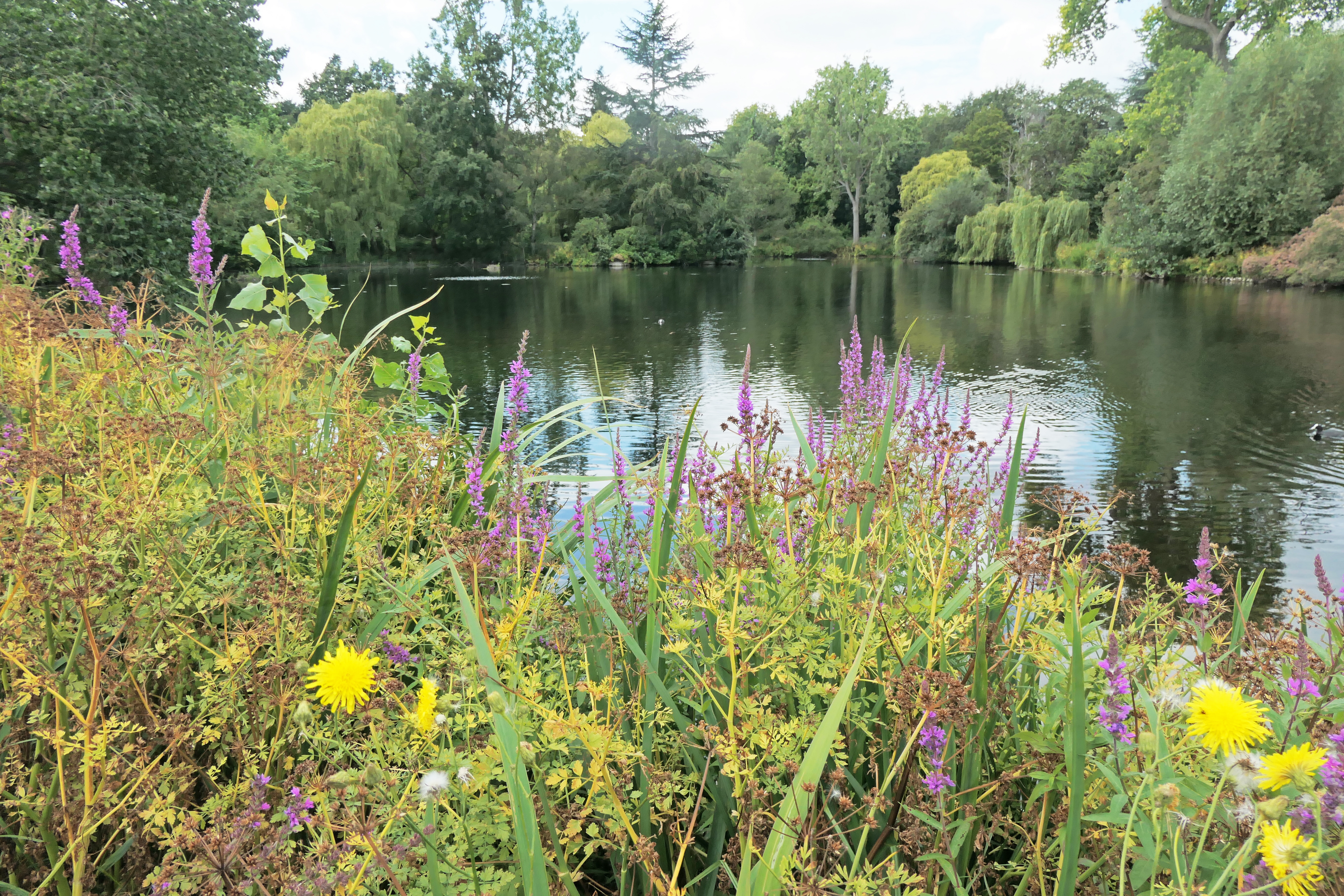
Another view of the lake

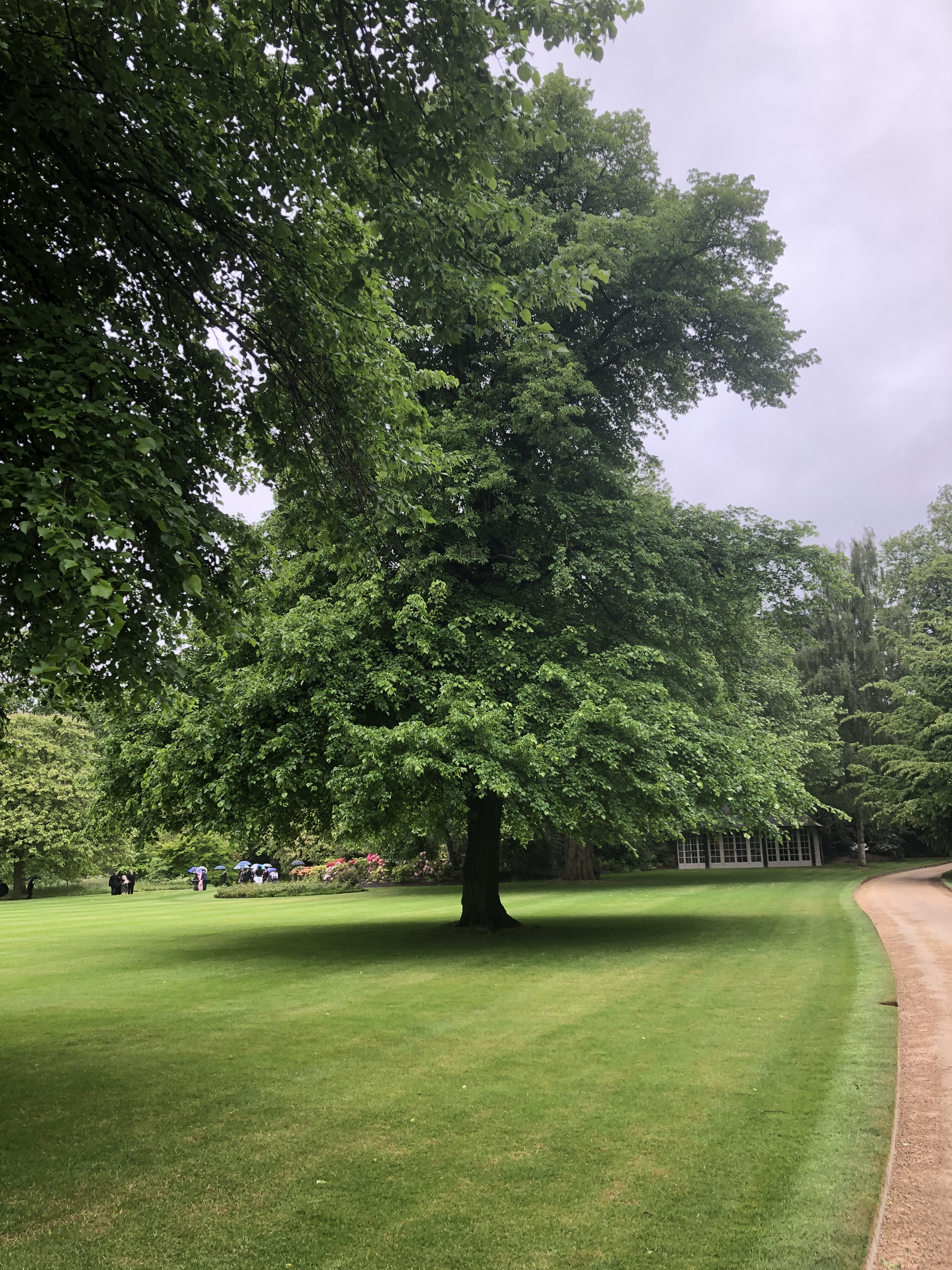
The lawns – the teahouse behind dates from 1939

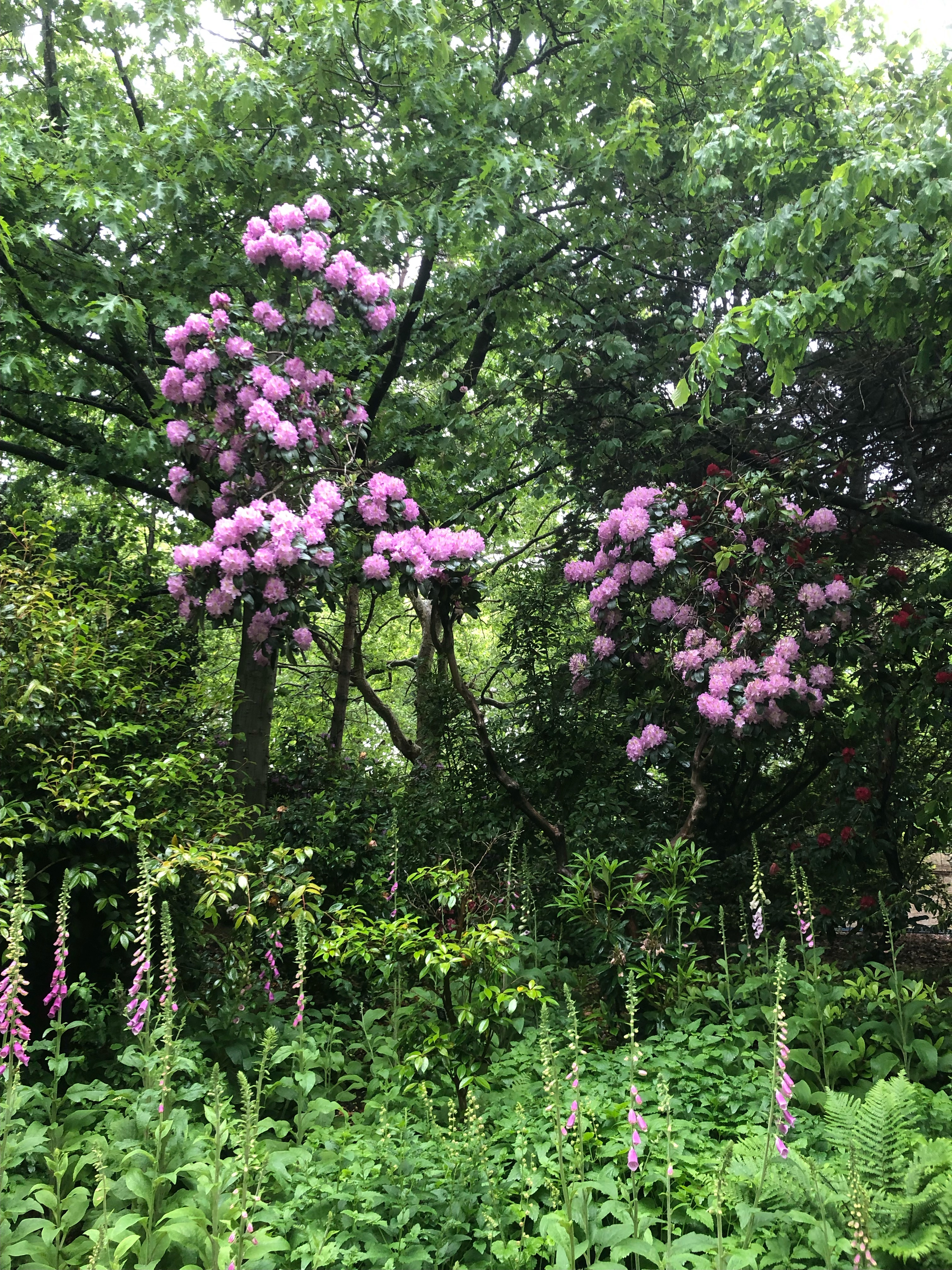
Planting

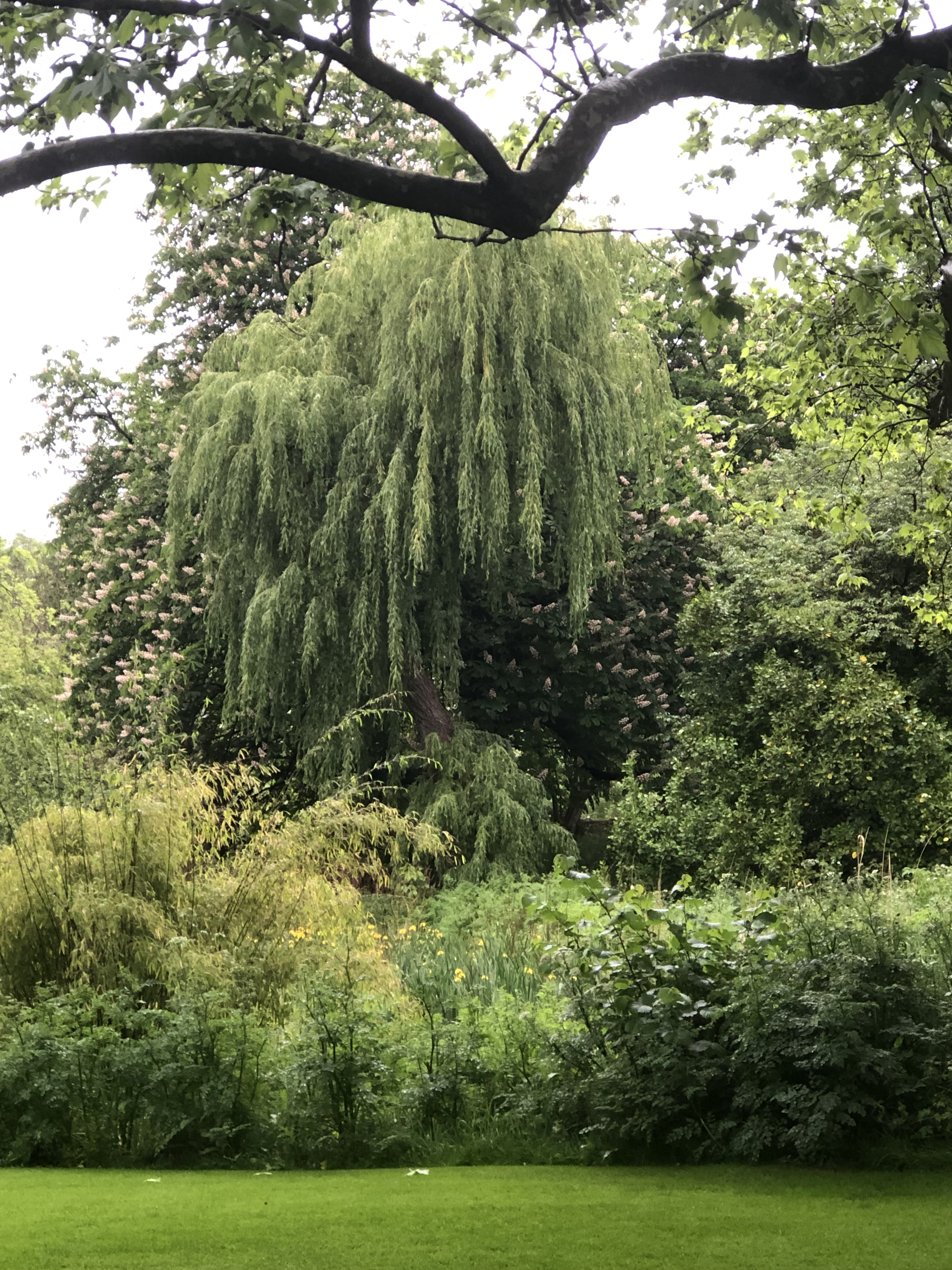
Willow tree

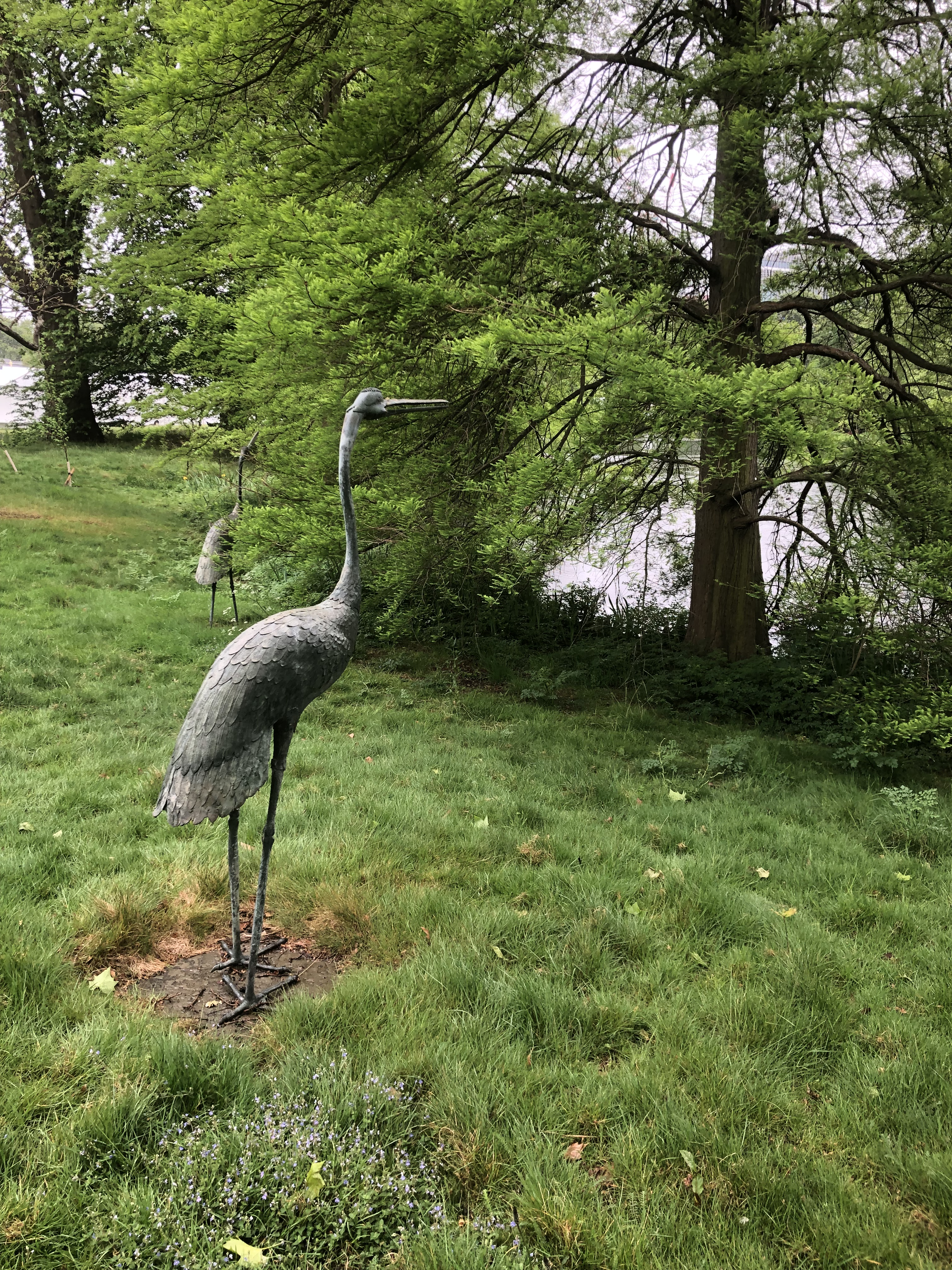
A pair of ornamental cranes presented to the future Edward VII when on a tour of India as Prince of Wales

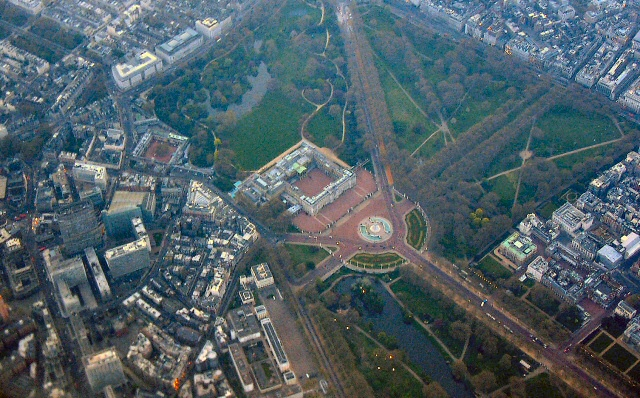
Aerial view – the garden lies behind the palace, with St James's Park to the front and Green Park to the right

== See also ==
- Golden Jubilee of Elizabeth II
- The Queen's Green Canopy
- List of landscape gardens
