= Waterloo Vase =

Decorative vase in Buckingham Palace

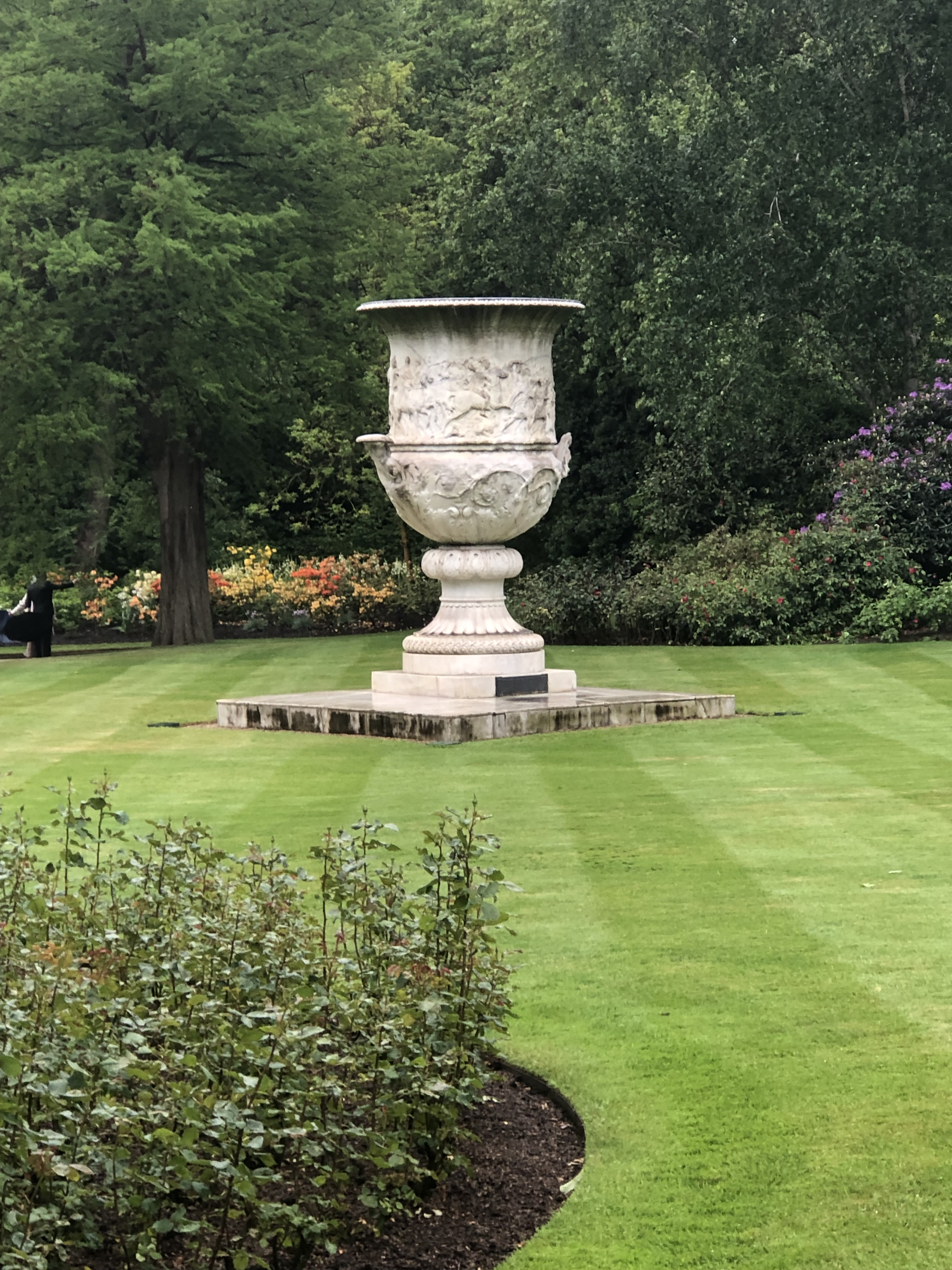
- The vase in Buckingham Palace Garden
- Artist: Richard Westmacott
- Completion date: 1830
- Type: Statue
- Medium: Carrara marble
- Subject: Battle of Waterloo
- Dimensions: 5.5 m × 3.0 m (18 ft × 9.8 ft)
- Location: Buckingham Palace gardens; London; England; United Kingdom; 51.5018°N 0.1484°W

Listed Building – Grade I
- Official name: Waterloo Vase in Buckingham Palace Garden
- Designated: 5 February 1970
- Reference no.: 12392440

The Waterloo Vase is a 15-foot (4.6 m) stone urn, situated in the garden of Buckingham Palace in central London. Fashioned from a single piece of Carrara marble, it was initially presented to Napoleon I, who intended to have it carved in celebration of anticipated future military victories. After the Emperor’s defeat at the Battle of Waterloo, the uncarved vase was given to the Prince Regent, later George IV. The Prince commissioned the sculptor, Richard Westmacott to decorate the vase with reliefs celebrating the victory at Waterloo. The original plan to place the vase in the Waterloo Gallery at Windsor Castle proved unrealisable, the weight of the vase being greater than the gallery’s floors could bear. It was therefore given to the National Gallery in Trafalgar Square. Considering the vase surplus to its requirements, the gallery placed it first in Hyde Park, London and then into storage at the Victoria and Albert Museum. In 1903, it was offered by the museum to the new king, Edward VII, who installed it as a garden ornament in the grounds of Buckingham Palace, where it remains. The vase is a Grade I listed structure.

== History and description ==
Emperor Napoleon I of France, passing through Tuscany on his journey to the Russian front, was shown a single massive block of marble; he asked for it to be preserved. It is thought that Napoleon may have ordered it to be roughly hewn into the present urn shape, leaving the panels undecorated in readiness to commemorate his expected victories.

Following the French defeat in the Napoleonic Wars, the vase was presented unfinished to the Prince Regent in 1815 by Ferdinand III, Grand Duke of Tuscany, via the British ambassador, Lord Burghersh. The Prince Regent, soon to become George IV, had the vase completed by the sculptor Richard Westmacott with the intention that it be the focal point of the new Waterloo chamber at Windsor Castle, commemorating the Battle of Waterloo, one of numerous triumphal commissions for Westmacott after Waterloo. (Note: Richard Westmacott received a “prodigal number” of commissions for statues, busts and carvings in central London in the Regency and early Victorian eras. As well as the Waterloo Vase, his works include sculpture on Marble Arch, the Wellington Monument, the statue of Francis Russell, 5th Duke of Bedford in Russell Square and that commemorating George Canning in Parliament Square.)

Inspired by Ancient Roman models, such as the Borghese Vase and the Medici Vase, the Waterloo Vase was carved with bas-reliefs of George III (long removed from public view) on his throne, Napoleon unhorsed, and various allegorical figures. Two winged busts of angels leap incongruously from the sides of the vase, resembling more the figureheads of an ancient ship than the handles of an elegant marble vase.

Various sources give differing descriptions of the vase's weight, with the 1968 book Buckingham Palace and its treasures stating a weight of twenty tons. No floor could bear the weight of the vase, so it was presented to the National Gallery in 1836. The Gallery finally returned the white elephant to the sovereign in 1906, and Edward VII had the vase placed outside in Buckingham Palace Garden. The vase stands some distance from the palace in a rose garden created in the 1960s to the northwest of the main building. It is placed on an austere brick paved plinth, the marble showing signs of severe erosion from atmospheric pollution. Restoration work was undertaken in the early 21st century. The vase is a Grade I listed structure.
