= Richard Westmacott =

British sculptor (1775–1856)

Sir Richard Westmacott RA
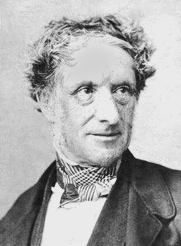
- Born: 15 July 1775; London, England
- Died: 1 September 1856 (aged 81); London, England
- Resting place: Chastleton, Oxfordshire, England
- Known for: sculpture

Sir Richard Westmacott RA (15 July 1775 – 1 September 1856) was a British sculptor.

== Life and career ==
Westmacott studied with his father, also named Richard Westmacott, at his studio in Mount Street, off Grosvenor Square in London before going to Rome in 1793 to study under Antonio Canova. Westmacott devoted all his energies to the study of classical sculpture, and throughout his life his real sympathies were with pagan rather than with Christian art. Within a year of his arrival in Rome he won the first prize for sculpture offered by the Florentine Academy of Arts, and in the following year he gained the papal gold medal awarded by the Academy of St Luke with his bas-relief of Joseph and his brothers. On returning to England in 1797, he set up a studio, where John Edward Carew and Musgrave Watson gained experience.

Westmacott had his own foundry at Pimlico, in London, where he cast both his own works, and those of other sculptors, including John Flaxman's statue of Sir John Moore for Glasgow. Late in life he was asked by the Office of Works for advice on the casting of the relief panels for Nelson's Column. He also had an arrangement with the Trustees of the British Museum, which allowed him to make moulds and supply plaster casts of classical sculpture in the museum's collection to country house owners, academies and other institutions.

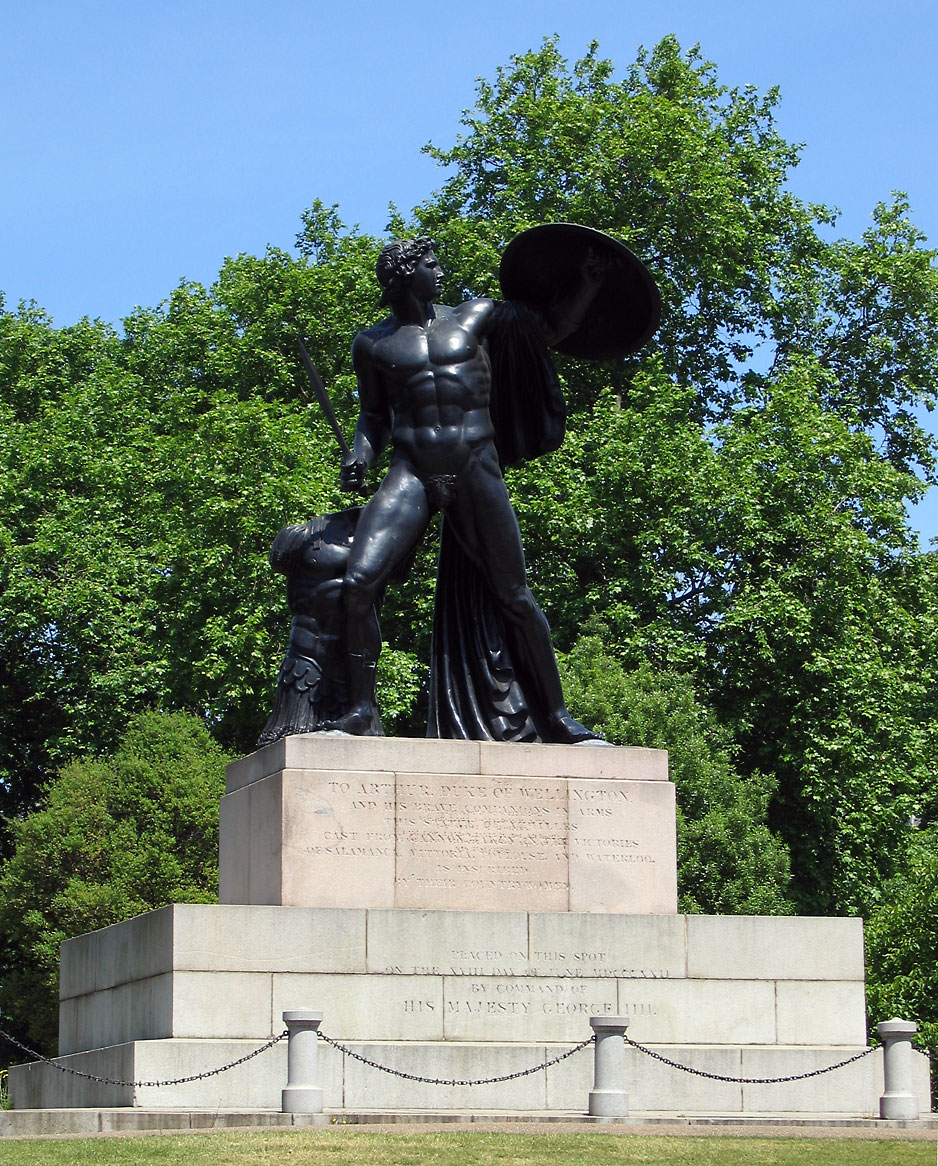
Statue of Achilles (1822) on the Wellington Monument at Hyde Park Corner, London.

Westmacott exhibited at the Royal Academy between 1797 and 1839. His name is given in the catalogues as "R. Westmacott, Junr." until 1807, when the "Junr." was dropped. He was elected an associate of the Royal Academy in 1805, and a full academician in 1811. His academy diploma piece, a marble relief of Jupiter and Ganymede, remains in the academy's collection. He was professor of sculpture at the academy from 1827 until his death. He received his knighthood on 19 July 1837. In 1852 when contacted by the Corporation of London about a possible sculpture commission, Westmacott replied that he had not been active as a sculptor for some years.

== Works ==
Among Westmacott's works include: the reliefs for the north side of Marble Arch; the Greek revival pedimental sculptures of figures representing The Progress of Civilisation on the British Museum; the Achilles of the Wellington Monument, London; and the Waterloo Vase, now in Buckingham Palace Gardens.

The Waterloo Vase was sculpted from a single piece of Carrara marble, earmarked by Napoleon to represent his military victories. Following the French defeat in the Napoleonic Wars, the vase was presented unfinished to George IV in 1815 by Ferdinand III, Grand Duke of Tuscany. George IV later commissioned Westmacott to complete the piece.

His statue of Horatio Nelson, Birmingham was the first statue of Nelson unveiled in Britain. There are other monuments to Nelson by Westmacott at the Bull Ring, Birmingham, in Barbados, while that at Liverpool was modelled and cast by Westmacott, to a design by Matthew Cotes Wyatt. In Liverpool there is also an equestrian statue of King George III sculpted by Westmacott, which was unveiled in 1822. He was responsible for the statue of the agriculturalist and developer Francis Russell, 5th Duke of Bedford in Russell Square, and that of the Duke of York on top of the column in Waterloo Place. His Achilles in Hyde Park, a bronze copy of an antique sculpture from Monte Cavallo in Rome, is a tribute to the Duke of Wellington, paid for by £10,000 raised by female subscribers.

Westmacott's sculptures of poetical subjects were in a style similar to those of the contemporary Italian school: his works of this type included Psyche and Cupid for the Duke of Bedford; Euphrosyne for the Duke of Newcastle; A Nymph Unclasping her Zone; The Distressed Mother and The Houseless Traveller.

Westmacott also sculpted the memorials to William Pitt the Younger, Spencer Perceval, Charles James Fox and Joseph Addison in Westminster Abbey; the statue of Fox in Bloomsbury Square; and those to Sir Ralph Abercromby, Lord Collingwood and Generals Edward Pakenham and Samuel Gibbs in St Paul's Cathedral. The Abercromby monument is considered by some critics as the most original composition of Westmacott's entire career. The idea to create a memorial to a British military hero by showing his death in action was a bold departure from the more common use of allegorical figures and personifications of virtue. The memorial, a free-standing marble group on an oval base, showed Abercromby falling dead from his charging horse into the arms of soldier and established Westmacott's reputation for originality. His memorial to Pitt in Westminster Abbey, commissioned in 1807, shows a male figure representing anarchy writhing in chains at Pitt's feet, a reference to Pitt's suppression of revolutionaries by press censorship and other means.

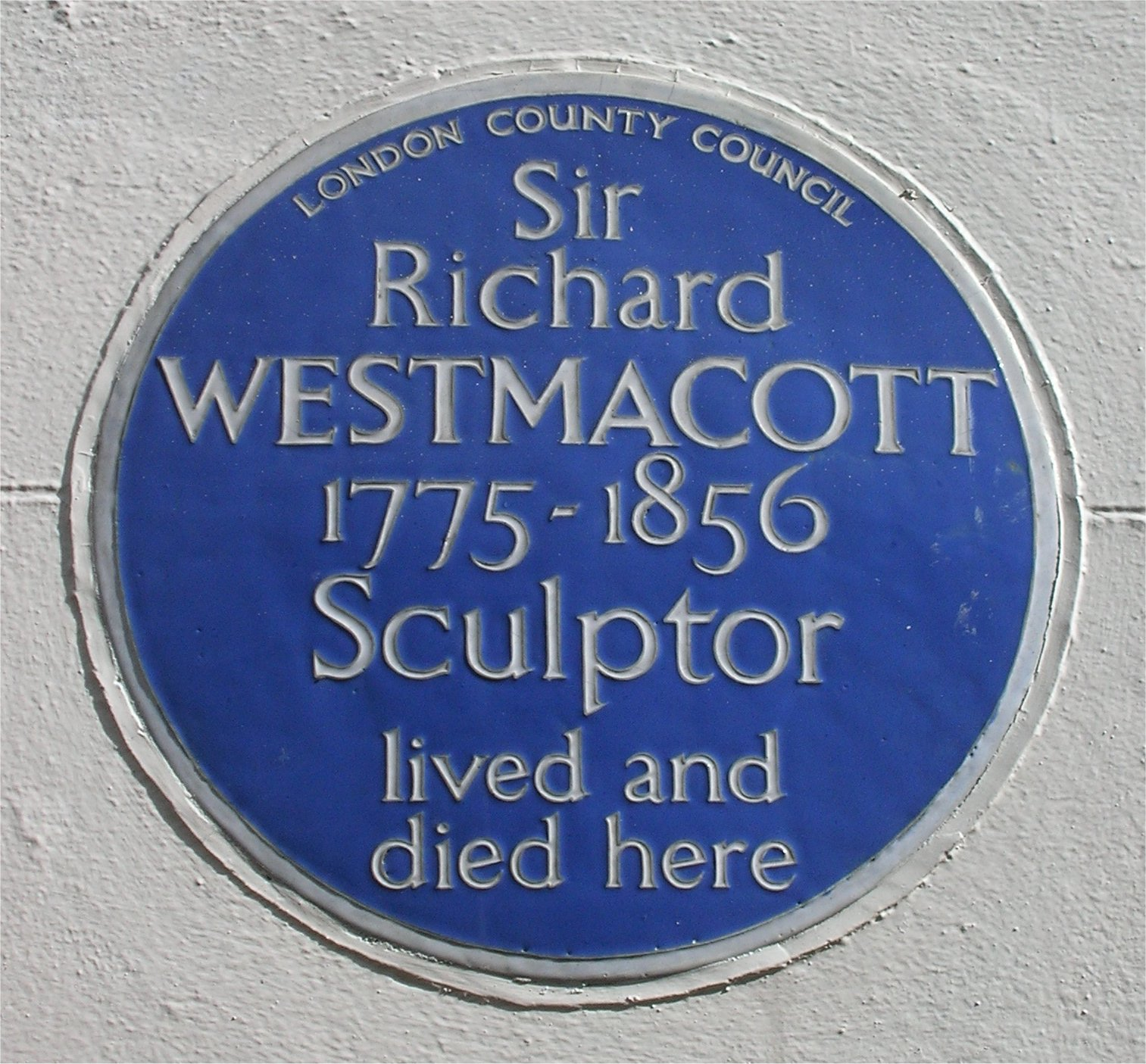
Blue plaque at 14 South Audley Street, London

Westmacott's other church monuments include those to Lt. General Christopher Jeaffreson (died 1824) in St.Mary's Church in Dullingham; to Commander Charles Cotton (died 1828) at St. Mary's Church in Madingley; to William Pemberton (died 1828) at St Margaret's Church in Newton, South Cambridgeshire; to Sir George Warren (died 1801) at St. Mary's Church, Stockport in Greater Manchester, depicting a standing female figure by an urn on a pillar; to Rev. Charles Prescott (died 1820), in St. Mary's Church, Stockport, showing a seated effigy and to Mary Henson (died 1805) in Bainton parish church, showing a seated figure against an urn. A bust of David Garrick by Westmacott is in Lichfield Cathedral.

He created a sculptural group for the marble arch of the Cumberland Gate to Hyde Park.

== Personal life ==
Westmacott lived and died at 14 South Audley Street, Mayfair, London where he is commemorated by a blue plaque. Two of his brothers, George, who was active between 1799 and 1827, and Henry, (1784–1861) were also sculptors. In 1798 Westmacott married Dorothy Margaret Wilkinson. Their son, also called Richard Westmacott, followed closely in his footsteps also becoming a notable sculptor, a Royal Academician and professor of sculpture at the academy.

Westmacott is buried in a tomb at St Mary's Church, Chastleton in Oxfordshire, where his third son Horatio was rector in 1878.

== Selected public works ==
=== 1800–1809 ===
| Image | Title / subject | Location and coordinates | Date | Type | Material | Dimensions | Designation | Wikidata | Notes |
|---|---|---|---|---|---|---|---|---|---|
| | Bishop John Warren | Westminster Abbey, London | After 1800 | Sculpture group | White and grey marble | | | | |
| More images | General Ralph Abercromby | St Paul's Cathedral, London | 1802-1805 | Equestrian sculpture group on pedestal & plinth with flanking sphinx figures | White marble | | | | |
| | Adam Duncan, 1st Viscount Duncan | Crypt of St Paul's Cathedral, London | After 1804 | Statue on pedestal | Marble | | | | |
| | Memorial to John Cooke | Crypt of St Paul's Cathedral, London | After 1805 | Sculpture on shallow pedestal | Marble | 3m tall | | | |
| More images | John Locke | University College London | 1808 | Statue | Marble | | | | |
| More images | William Pitt the Younger | Westminster Abbey, London | c. 1808 | Statue group | Marble | | | Q113700278 | |
| More images | Statue of Horatio Nelson | Bull Ring, Birmingham, West Midlands | 1809 | Sculpture group on pedestal | Bronze and stone | Statue 170 cm high, pedestal 370 cm high | Grade II* | Q7604486 | |
| More images | Statue of Francis Russell, 5th Duke of Bedford | Russell Square, London | 1809 | Statue group on cylindrical pedestal | Bronze and granite | | Grade II | Q27082115 | |
| More images | Joseph Addison | Poets' Corner, Westminster Abbey, London | 1809 | Statue on pedestal | Marble | | | | |

=== 1810–1819 ===
| Image | Title / subject | Location and coordinates | Date | Type | Material | Dimensions | Designation | Wikidata | Notes |
|---|---|---|---|---|---|---|---|---|---|
| | Sir Isaac Brock | St Paul's Cathedral, London | c. 1813 | Sculpture group | Marble | | | | |
| More images | Cuthbert Collingwood, 1st Baron Collingwood | St Paul's Cathedral, London | 1813 | Sculpture group on plinth | Marble | | | | |
| More images | Statue of Robert Milligan | West India Docks, London | 1813 | Statue on pedestal with plaques | Bronze and stone | | | Q96183031 | Removed 2020 |
| More images | Monument to Horatio Nelson | Exchange Flags, Liverpool | 1813 | Statue group on pedestal with plaques | Stone, bronze and granite | | Grade II* | Q4343277 | Designer, Matthew Cotes Wyatt |
| More images | Statue of Horatio Nelson | Bridgetown, Barbados | 1813 | Statue on pedestal | Bronze and stone | | | Q107548492 | Relocated to Barbados Museum in 2020 |
| More images | Statue of Charles James Fox | Bloomsbury Square, London | 1814, erected 1816 | Statue on cuboid pedestal | Bronze and granite | 5.2m tall | Grade II* | Q17542668 | |
| More images | Memorial to Elizabeth Stanhope | Newton Chapel, Bristol Cathedral | After 1816 | Relief & plaque | Marble | | | | |
| More images | William Pitt the Younger | Pembroke College, Cambridge | 1819 | Seated statue on pedestal | Stone | | | Q26379565 | |

=== 1820–1829 ===
| Image | Title / subject | Location and coordinates | Date | Type | Material | Dimensions | Designation | Wikidata | Notes |
|---|---|---|---|---|---|---|---|---|---|
| More images | Charles James Fox | Westminster Abbey, London | 1822 | Sculpture group | Marble | | | | |
| More images | Spencer Perceval | Westminster Abbey, London | 1822 | Statue group & relief | Marble | | | | |
| More images | Wellington Monument, London | Hyde Park Corner, London | 1822 | Statue on pedestal | Bronze and granite | | Grade I | Q13528921 | |
| More images | George III | Monument Place, Liverpool | 1822 | Equestrian statue on pedestal | Bronze and stone | | Grade II | Q26629818 | |
| More images | Memorial to John Eliot, 1st Earl of St Germans (1761 - 1823) | St Germanus of Auxerre, St Germans, Cornwall | 1823 | Plaque with relief | Stone | | Grade I | | |
| | Memorial to John Egerton, 7th Earl of Bridgewater and Charlotte Egerton, Countess of Bridgewater | Church of St Peter and St Paul, Little Gaddesden | After 1823 | Plaque with relief | Stone | | | | |
| More images | Generals Edward Pakenham & Samuel Gibbs | St Paul's Cathedral, London | 1824 | Twin statues on pedestal | Marble | | | | |
| | Memorial to Caroline, Countress Brownlow | Church of St Peter and St Paul, Belton, South Kesteven | 1824 | Relief | Marble | | Grade I | | |
| More images | The Distressed Mother, memorial to Elizabeth Warren | Westminster Abbey, London | c. 1825 | Statue on pedestal | Marble | | | | |
| More images | England with Scotland and Ireland and Peace with Trophies of War | North face of Marble Arch, London | 1828 | Two reliefs | Marble | 150 cm square | Grade I | Q845529 | |
| | Francis Egerton, 8th Earl of Bridgewater | Church of St Peter and St Paul, Little Gaddesden | 1829 | Sculpture group in relief | Stone | | | | |

=== 1830–1839 ===
| Image | Title / subject | Location and coordinates | Date | Type | Material | Dimensions | Designation | Wikidata | Notes |
|---|---|---|---|---|---|---|---|---|---|
| | Warren Hastings | Victoria Memorial, Kolkata | 1830 | Statue | Marble | | | | |
| More images | Waterloo Vase | Buckingham Palace Garden, London | 1830 | Vase with reliefs | Carrara marble | 5.5m x 3.0m | Grade I | Q7974302 | |
| More images | Tomb of Antoine Philippe, Duke of Montpensier | Westminster Abbey, London | 1830 | Tomb effigy | Marble | | | | Second version at the Château de Randan, France |
| More images | Statue of George III | Windsor Great Park | 1831 | Equestrian statue on pedestal | Bronze and stone | | Grade I | Q7727584 | |
| More images | Statue of George Canning | Parliament Square, London | 1832 | Statue on pedestal | Bronze and granite | 7.9m tall | Grade II | Q21546419 | |
| More images | Duke of York | Duke of York Column, London | 1833 | Statue on pedestal and column | Bronze and stone | 4.2m statue, 3m pedestal, 34m column | Grade I | Q2911131 | Architect, Benjamin Dean Wyatt |
| | Dr. John Alderson | Hull Royal Infirmary | 1833 | Statue on pedestal | Marble and stone | | Grade II | Q26568781 | |
| | Dorothy Margaret Westmacott | St Nicholas' Church, Brighton | 1834 | Funerary bust | | | | | |
| | Joseph Drury | St Mary's Church, Harrow on the Hill, London | 1835 | Relief plaque | Marble | | Grade I | | |

=== 1840 and later ===
| Image | Title / subject | Location and coordinates | Date | Type | Material | Dimensions | Designation | Wikidata | Notes |
|---|---|---|---|---|---|---|---|---|---|
| | Lord William Bentinck | Victoria Memorial, Kolkata | 1841 | Statue on pedestal | Bronze & stone | | | | |
| More images | The Progress of Civilisation | British Museum, London | 1847 | Pediment sculptures | Stone | | Grade I | | |
| | Mary, Queen of Scots | Hardwick Hall, Derbyshire | | Statue on pedestal | Marble and stone | | | | Relocated from Chatsworth House |

=== Other works ===
- Life-sized marble relief monument to John Yorke, 1801, St Andrews Church, Wimpole, Cambridgeshire
- Memorial sculpture group, erected 1821, to Richard Pennant, 1st Baron Penrhyn, died 1808, Church of St Tegal, Llandygai, Wales
- Memorial to Rev. John Chetwynd Talbot, 1827, St Mary's Church, Ingestre, Staffordshire
- Memorial to Dr. John Wooll, c. 1833, Utah
- Memorial plaque, with portrait medallion, to Francis Bauer, 1840, St. Anne's Church, Kew,

== Sources ==
- Busco, Marie. "Westmacott, Sir Richard (1775–1856)". Oxford Dictionary of National Biography (online ed.). Oxford University Press. doi:10.1093/ref:odnb/29114. (Subscription, Wikipedia Library access or UK public library membership required.)
- Dodgson, Campbell (1899). "Westmacott, Richard (1775-1856)" . In Lee, Sidney (ed.). Dictionary of National Biography. Vol. 60. London: Smith, Elder & Co.
- Pevsner, Nikolaus (1970). Cambridgeshire. The Buildings of England (second ed.). Penguin Books.
