= Statue of Lord Nelson, Bridgetown =

Statue formerly installed in Bridgetown, Barbados

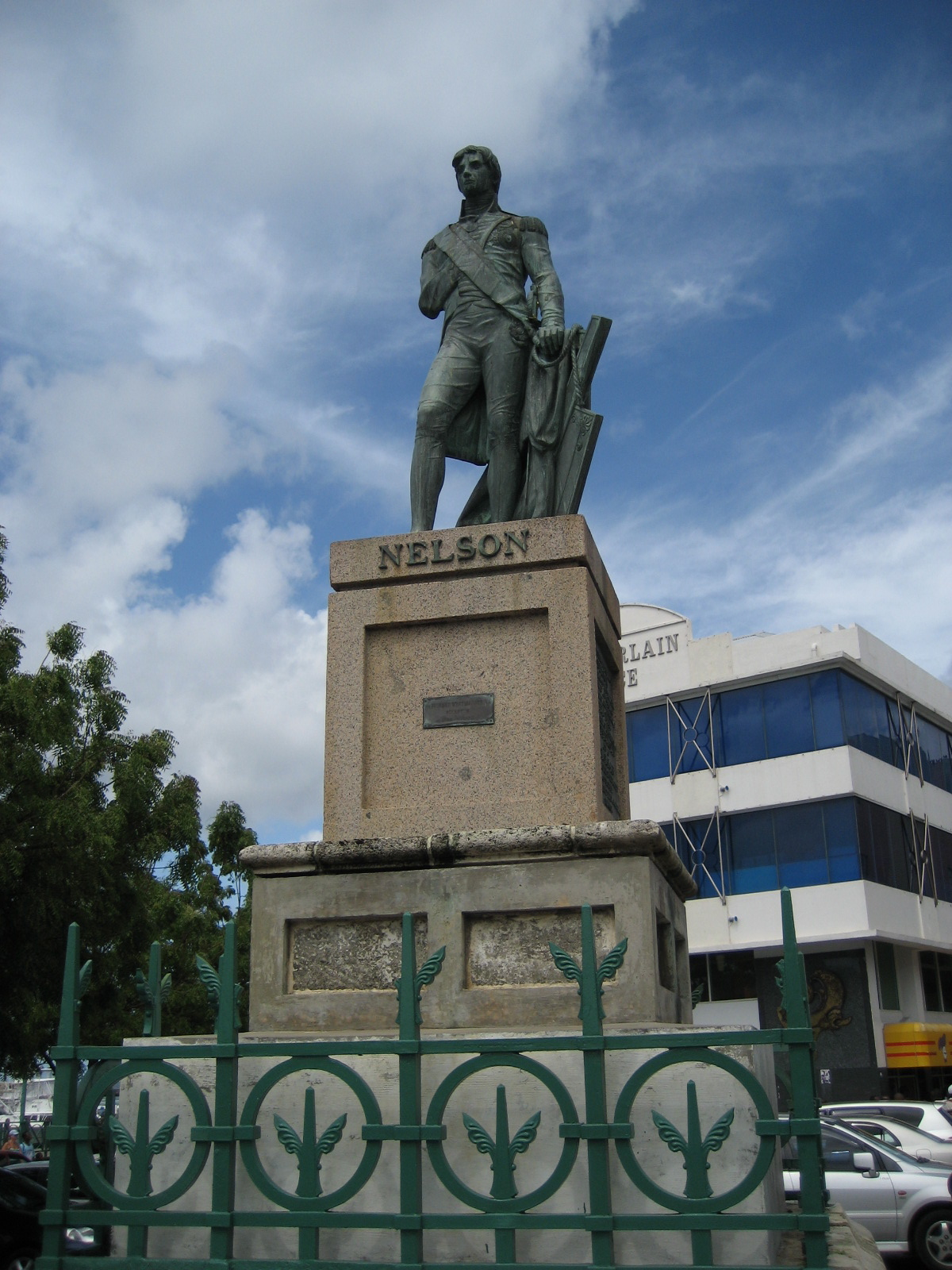
- The statue in 2007
- Artist: Richard Westmacott
- Completion date: 22 March 1813
- Medium: Bronze
- Subject: Horatio Nelson, 1st Viscount Nelson
- Location: Barbados Museum, Bridgetown, Barbados

A bronze statue of British naval officer Horatio Nelson, 1st Viscount Nelson by Richard Westmacott was installed at National Heroes Square (formerly Trafalgar Square) in Bridgetown, Barbados, from 1813 to 2020. It is based on Westmacott's design for a statue of Nelson in Birmingham, England. In 2020 it was relocated to the Barbados Museum.

== History ==
In 1805, Nelson and the British fleet had visited Barbados while pursuing the Franco-Spanish fleet in the lead-up to the Battle of Trafalgar. A bronze statue sculpted by Richard Westmacott was erected in his honour on 22 March 1813 in what became known as Trafalgar Square, and Barbados' Parliament Buildings were constructed nearby in the late 19th century. The statue was a prominent landmark, and it was depicted on several Barbadian postage stamps issued between 1906 and 1964.

== Removal ==
Trafalgar Square was renamed National Heroes Square in 1999. As colonial symbol, the statue became increasingly controversial and wreath-laying ceremonies on the anniversary of the Battle of Trafalgar ceased. The monument was vandalised in November 2017 on the eve of Independence Day celebrations, when blue and yellow paint was daubed on the statue and its plinth. A message describing Nelson as a "racist and white supremacist" was placed along the base.

On June 7, 2020, a movement called Nelson Must Go was started by Barbadian Alex Downes, petitioning the Government to remove the statue of Admiral Lord Horatio Nelson from Heroes Square. The petition gained over 10 000 signatures, and on 24 July 2020, John King, the Minister with responsibility for Culture, announced that the statue would be removed during the national Season of Emancipation, which came to an end on 23 August. The removal was postponed in order to concentrate available funds on completing and opening a park in Saint Thomas, and eventually occurred on the International Day for Tolerance. The statue was rehoused in the Barbados Museum.
