= Statue of Lord Nelson, Birmingham =

Statue of Horatio Nelson in Birmingham, England

Coordinates: 52.4775°N 1.8939°W

Statue of Lord Nelson
- The statue with railings, in 2012
- Artist: Richard Westmacott
- Completion date: 25 October 1809
- Medium: Bronze sculpture
- Subject: Horatio Nelson, 1st Viscount Nelson
- Dimensions: 170 cm × 150 cm (67 in × 59 in)
- Designation: Grade II* listed
- Location: Birmingham, England
- Owner: Birmingham City Council
- Commissioner: The people of Birmingham

The Statue of Horatio Nelson, 1st Viscount Nelson, by Richard Westmacott stands in the Bull Ring, Birmingham, England. It was erected there in 1809, four years after Nelson's death

== Background ==
Nelson, with Lord and Lady Hamilton, made an overnight visit to the then town of Birmingham in August 1802, the year before he sailed against the fleets of Napoleon. He visited a number of businesses, inlcuding Henry Clay's papier-mâché manufactory, Francis Eginton's stained glass works, and Matthew Boulton's Soho Manufactory, as well as visiting Boulton himself, who was confined to bed through ill-heath.

Nelson was killed by a French bullet on his flagship, HMS Victory, at the Battle of Trafalgar on 21 October 1805. News of his death reached Birmingham on 7 November.

== Subscription ==
There were soon calls for the town to commemorate Nelson. A meeting was convened on on 23 November, where it was "unanimously resolved that some monument, statue, or pillar should be erected, by subscription, in this town, to commemorate the glorious achievements of the Hero that fought, conquered, and fell at the battle of Trafalgar."

Subsequent proposals included a "naval pillar", or column, "one hundred feet high, with an appropriate building with two fronts, suitable for a dispensary and a post-office, or for other public business", as well as a bronze or marble statue.

The cost was to be bourne by subscribers - largely working people donating small amounts. At their meeting held in Birmingham on 13 June 1906, they reviewed a maquette presented by Westmacott, and decided on a bronze statue to his design. A committee was appointed oversee the commission.

It was finally cast in 1809 at a total cost of £2,500 (equivalent to £174,586 in 2025) - the first publicly funded statue in Birmingham, and the first statue of Nelson in Britain.

A site at the centre of the market place was chosen, opposite the Dog Inn, which was later renamed the Nelson Inn.

The statue was unveiled on 25 October 1809, the day of the official Golden Jubilee of George III.

Joseph Farror, an auctioneer, who lived in nearby High Street, bequeathed the sum of sixpence per week, to be paid in perpetuity out of the rent of a house in Bradford Street, for cleaning the statue and its base. The money was to be received by the churchwardens of St. Martin's.

== Description ==
Nelson and HMS Victory

At the unveiling, handbills giving a description by Westmacott were distributed. It read:

In this work, intended to perpetuate the greatest example of naval genius, simplicity has been the chief object in the arrangement. The hero is represented in a reposed and dignified attitude, his left arm reclining on an anchor. He appears in the costume of his native country, invested with the insignia of those honours by which his sovereign and distant princes distinguished him. To the right of the statue the grand symbol of the naval profession is introduced. Victory, the constant attendant upon her favourite hero, embelishes the prow. To the left is disposed a sail, which, being placed behind the statue, gives breadth to that view of the composition. Above the ship is a fac-simile of the Flag Staff Truck of L'Orient, which was fished up by Sir Samuel Hood the day following the battle of the Nile, and presented by him to Lord Nelson, the same being deposited at Mitford as a trophy of that ever memorable action. This group is mounted upon a pedestal of statuary marble, a circular form having been selected as best adapted to the situation. To personify that affectionate regard which caused the present patriotic tribute to be raised, the town, Birmingham, is represented in a dejected attitude, murally crowned, mourning her loss; she being accompanied by groups of genii, or children, in allusion to the rising generation, who offer consolation to her, by producing the trident and the rudder.

In front of the pedestal is the following inscription:—

This Statue
in Honour of
Admiral
Lord Nelson
Was Erected
by the
Inhabitants of Birmingham.
A.D. M.DCCC.IX.

The whole is enclosed by iron palisadoes, in the form of boarding pikes, connected by a twisted cable, and at each of the four corners is fixed a cannon erect, from which issues a lamp-post, representing a cluster of pikes supporting a ship lantern.

Nelson is depicted at under life size, and with an empty sleeve indicting his amputated right arm. The Orient, was the flagship of the French fleet, sunk at the Battle of the Nile.

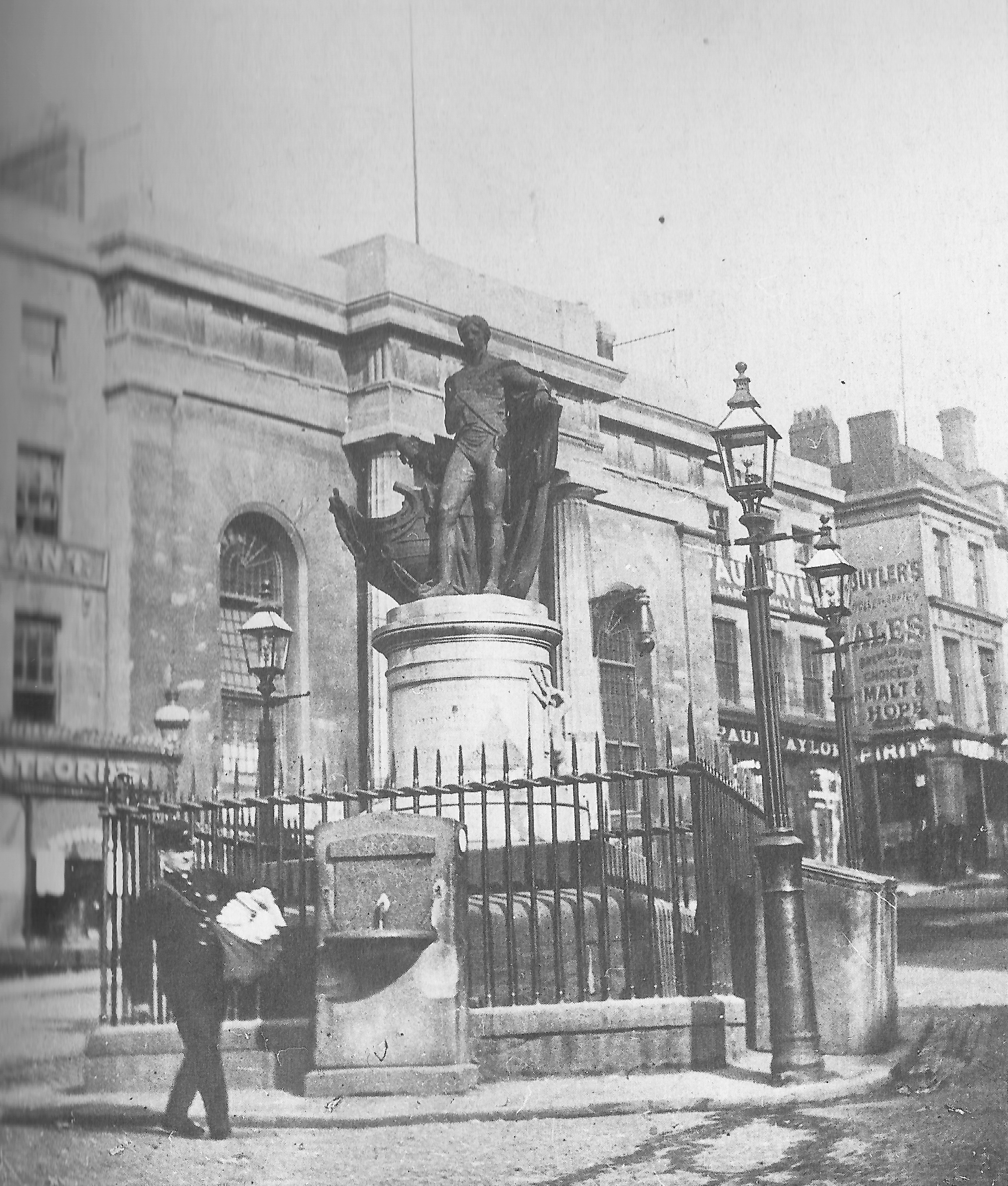
The statue in 1898, with Birmingham Market Hall behind it. The lamp posts, made from naval cannons, were part of the original design.

The statue was originally erected on the site of the Old Cross, a two-storey building (a meeting hall over an open space), built in 1703 and demolished in August 1784. It stood outside the Market Hall (opened adjacent to it in 1835), and survived the hall's destruction in the Birmingham Blitz during World War II.

A related statue was constructed in Bridgetown, Barbados, in 1813. Like the Birmingham statue, it was sculpted by Westmacott, based on the same design. In 2020, after years of campaigning, it was removed and placed in a museum.

== Relocations ==
Since 25 April 1952 the statue has had Grade II* listed status.

Drawing of the statue (Gentleman's Magazine, May 1812) showing the original plinth, lost in the 1961 reloctaion

It was moved in 1961 during the redevelopment of the Bull Ring and the carved plinth, cannons, and lanterns lost.

During the Bull Ring's further redevelopment, completed in September 2003, it returned close to its original location north of the church. It stands on the high balcony between the Bullring shopping centre and the Selfridges store. Nelson now looks again over the church of St Martin in the Bull Ring. He now stands on a plain plinth, surrounded by iron railings linked by iron rope. These railings were the original railings, but were delayed from being installed by objections on the grounds of health and safety from the Bullring. However, the railings were restored in September 2005, just in time for the city's Trafalgar Bicentenary celebrations which centred on the statue.

The statue forms the centrepiece of Birmingham's annual Trafalgar Day commemoration.

In 2009, to mark the 200th anniversary of the statue's unveiling, a medal was struck by St Paul's Mint of Birmingham.

== Sources ==
- Solid Citizens – Statues in Birmingham, Bridget Pugh and Anne Irby Crews, 1983, Westwood Press, Sutton Coldfield, ISBN 0-9502636-5-6
- A History of Birmingham, Chris Upton, 1993, ISBN 0-85033-870-0
