= Statue of Charles James Fox =

Statue in London by Richard Westmacott

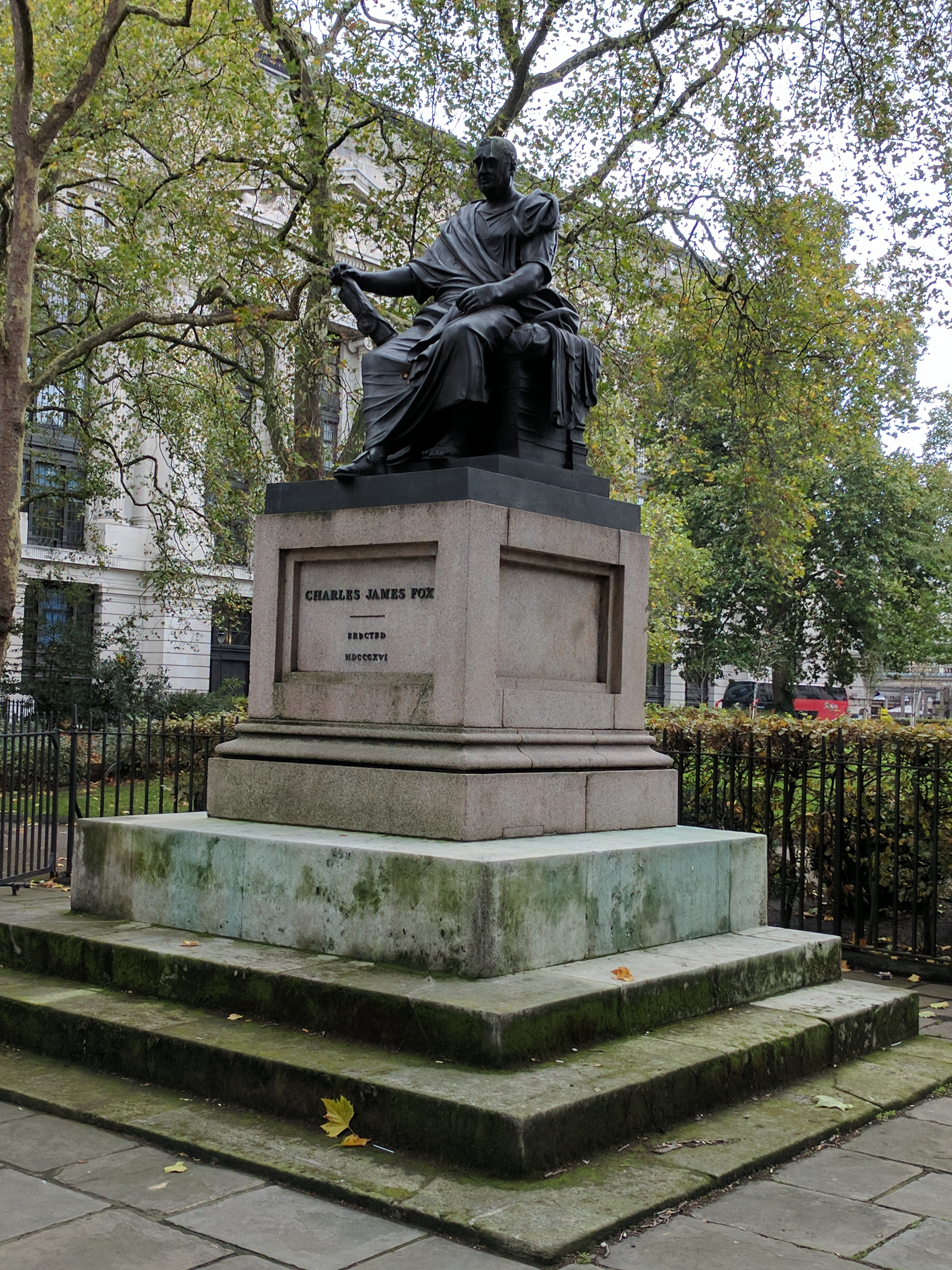
- Artist: Richard Westmacott
- Completion date: 1814
- Type: Sculpture
- Medium: Bronze
- Subject: Charles James Fox
- Dimensions: (9ft ft)
- Location: Bloomsbury, London; 51.5193°N 0.1232°W

Listed Building – Grade II*
- Official name: Statue of Charles James Fox at North End of Garden
- Designated: 24 October 1951
- Reference no.: 1244458

The statue of Charles James Fox stands at the north end of Bloomsbury Square in the London borough of Camden. Erected in 1816, the sculptor was Richard Westmacott. It commemorates the Whig politician who died in 1806. Fox is shown in the garb of a Roman senator. The statue is a Grade II* listed structure.

== History ==
Charles James Fox (24 January 1749 – 13 September 1806), enjoyed a political career of nearly forty years. Rarely holding office, he championed a range of liberal causes, including American independence, the French Revolution, Catholic Emancipation and the abolition of slavery. Personally dissolute, with weaknesses for women, gambling and alcohol, he died, heavily in debt, at the age of 57. His career has been described as of "almost unrelieved failure" but his generosity of mind, his famed charm and his "genius for friendship" left his many friends and admirers desolate at his death. As well as paying for his funeral, clearing his debts, and funding a pension for his widow, they raised the considerable sum of £12,450 for a memorial. The sum was sufficient to allow for two, a statue in Westminster Abbey, and that located in Bloomsbury Square. The site was given by John Russell, 6th Duke of Bedford, son of Fox's great friend, the 5th Duke. The sculptor was Richard Westmacott and the statue was completed in 1814 and raised in 1816.

== Description ==
The statue is of bronze and shows Fox in the robes of a Roman senator. He is seated, reputedly as his friends considered that a realistic portrayal of a standing Fox would have appeared undignified, due to his corpulence. Fox holds a copy of Magna Carta, symbolising his commitment to liberty. The statue stands on a granite plinth which is carved with Fox's full name and the date of the statue's erection. (Note: Fox's Westminster Abbey memorial has the even briefer inscription of Charles James Fox and the dates of his birth and death, his colleagues having been unable to agree on his most significant achievements.) The plinth itself is raised on a four-staged pedestal base. The statue is 2.74 metres (9.0 ft) high and the plinth it stands on is 2.43 metres (8.0 ft).

The statue was designated a Grade II listed structure in 1951. It was promoted to a Grade II* listing on 23 August 2008, UNESCO's International Day for the Remembrance of the Slave Trade and its Abolition, though the statue does not explicitly reference Fox's championing of the abolitionist cause. (Note: The memorial in Westminster Abbey does specifically reference Fox's support for Abolition, depicting a dying Fox supported by an allegorical figure of Liberty and mourned by a slave.)

== Sources ==
- Blackwood, John (1989). London's Immortals: The Complete Outdoor Commemorative Statues. London: Savoy Press. ISBN 0-9514296-0-4. OCLC 21328602.
- Cherry, Bridget; Pevsner, Nikolaus (2002), London 4: North, The Buildings of England, New Haven, US, London, UK: Yale University Press, ISBN 9780300096538, OCLC 846526006
- Darke, Jo (1991), The Monument Guide to England and Wales: A National Portrait in Bronze and Stone, London: MacDonald and Co., OCLC 1008240876
- Dresser, Madge (1 October 2007), "Set in Stone? Statues and Slavery in London", History Workshop Journal, 64 (1): 162–199, doi:10.1093/hwj/dbm032
