= Swamp cypress =

Swamp cypress is a common name for more than one species of plants in the family Cupressaceae (cypresses):

- Species of the genus Taxodium
  - Taxodium distichum, native to the Southeastern and Gulf Coastal Plains of the United States
- Glyptostrobus pensilis, native to subtropical southeastern China
- Actinostrobus pyramidalis, native to southwest Western Australia
