= Wellington Monument, London =

Sculpture in London by Richard Westmacott

Coordinates: 51.5045°N 0.1527°W

Wellington Monument
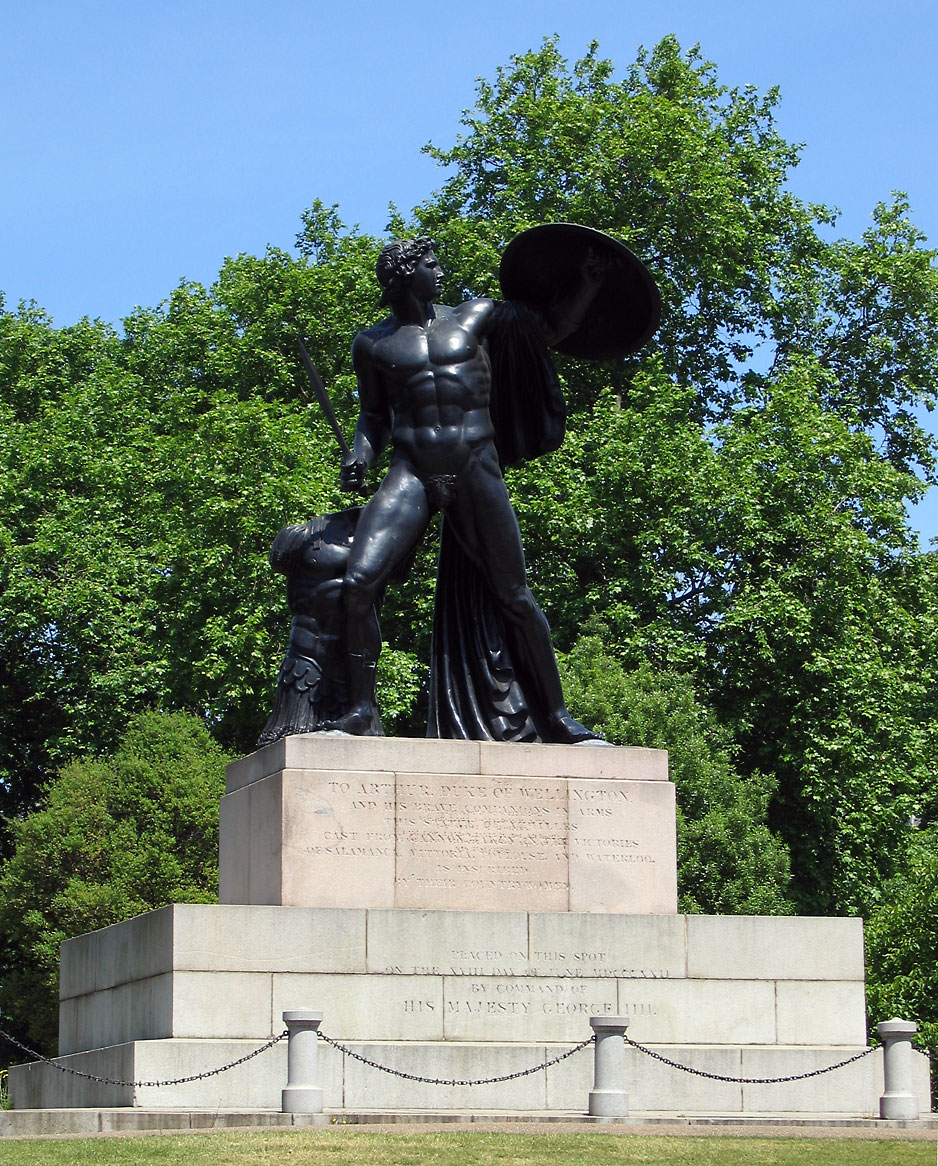
- Interactive map of Wellington Monument
- Location: London
- Type: Sculpture
- Dedicated date: Arthur Wellesley, 1st Duke of Wellington

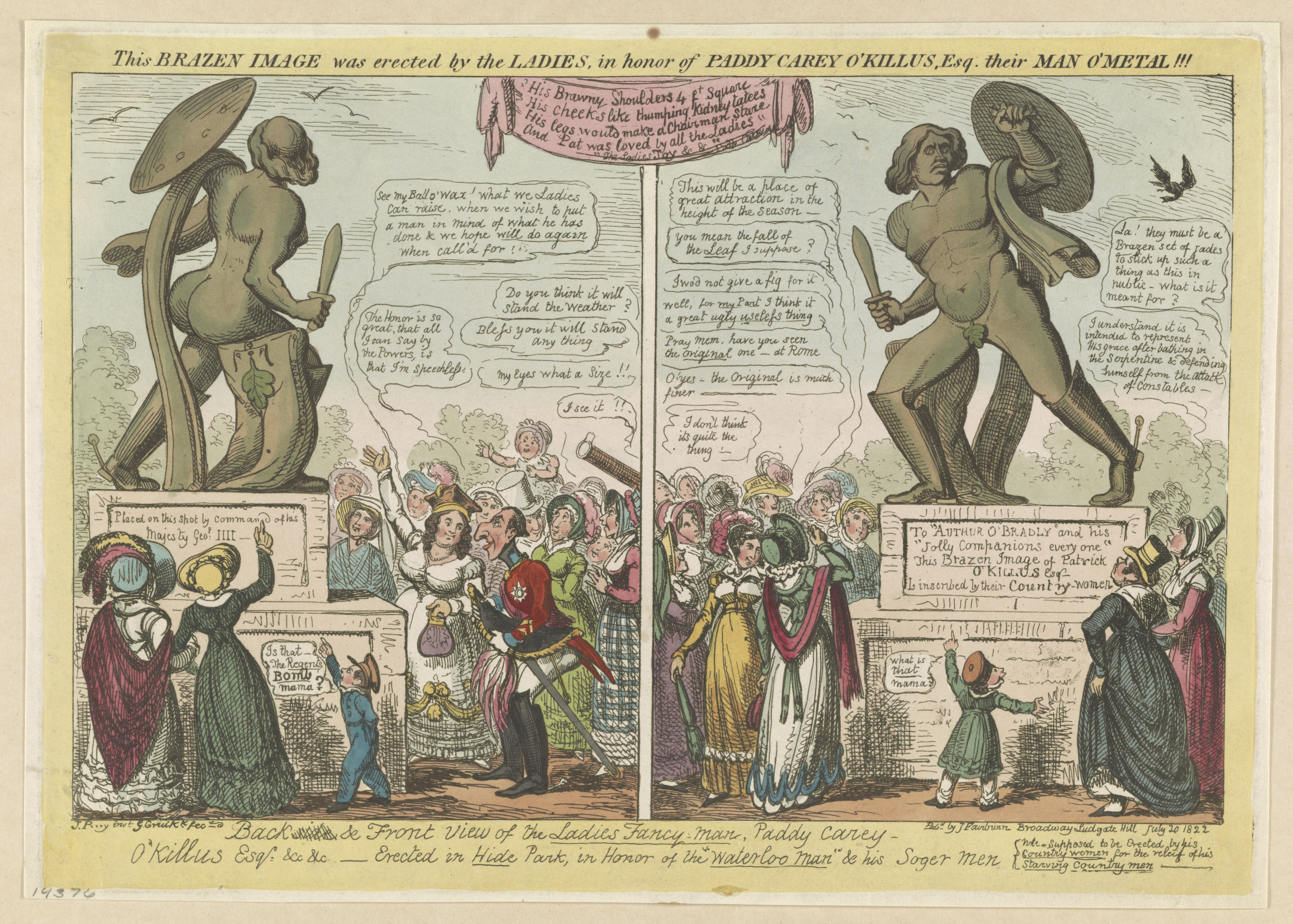
Back~~side~~ & front view of the ladies fancy-man, Paddy Carey O'Killus Esq &c &c - Erected in Hide Park, in honor of the "Waterloo man" & his Soger men, by Cruikshank

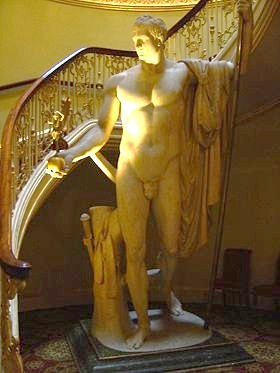
Canova's Napoleon

The Wellington Monument is a statue representing Achilles erected as a memorial to Arthur Wellesley, 1st Duke of Wellington, and his victories in the Peninsular War and the latter stages of the Napoleonic Wars. It is sited at the south-western end of Park Lane in London, and was inaugurated on 18 June 1822. Its total height, including the sculpture, base and the mound on which it stands, is 36 feet (11 m).

The monument's colossal 18 feet (5.5 m) high statue is by the sculptor Richard Westmacott, produced from melted-down captured enemy cannon. Based on the poses of the Borghese Gladiator and more particularly the Quirinal Horse Tamers, it shows the Greek mythological hero as a muscular, nude young man, raising his shield with his left hand and his short sword in his right hand, with his armour standing by his right thigh and his cloak draped over his left shoulder. The monument was funded by donations from British women totalling £10,000. On being transported to its final site, the entrance gates into Hyde Park were too low for it to fit, so it proved necessary to knock a hole in the adjoining wall. The inscription on the statue's Dartmoor granite base reads:

To Arthur Duke of Wellington
and his brave companions in arms
this statue of Achilles
cast from cannon taken in the victories
of Salamanca, Vittoria, Toulouse, and Waterloo
is inscribed
by their country women
Placed on this spot
on the XVIII day of June MDCCCXXII
by command of
His Majesty George IIII.

This was London's first public nude sculpture since antiquity and, though the artist had already included a fig leaf over the figure's genitalia, much controversy still resulted, pitching the sculptor's supporters such as Benjamin Robert Haydon against fierce critics such as George Cruikshank in his Backside & front view of the ladies fancy-man, Paddy Carey O'Killus'.

The controversy may also have been linked to Canova's Napoleon as Mars the Peacemaker that had arrived just before this at Apsley House, and also treated on whether Achilles was a metaphor for military heroism in general, Wellington in particular or both.
