= Coeur =

Cœur is the French word for heart, and may refer to:

- Cœurs, a 2006 French film by Alain Resnais
- "Cœur" (song), a song by Zoé Clauzure which won the Junior Eurovision Song Contest 2023
- Coeur (playing cards), a brand of playing card produced by VEB Altenburg in East Germany

== People with the surname ==
- Jacques Cœur (c. 1395 – 1456), 15th-century French merchant and royal treasurer
- Jacques Joli-Cœur (born 1940), Canadian politician

== See also ==
- Coeur d'Alene (disambiguation)
- Coeur de Lion (disambiguation)
- Coeurl, a fictional extraterrestrial species invented by A. E. van Vogt
- Francoeur (surname)
- Richard Coeur-de-lion (disambiguation)
