= Statue of Isambard Kingdom Brunel, Victoria Embankment =

Statue in London by Carlo Marochetti

Statue of Isambard Kingdom Brunel
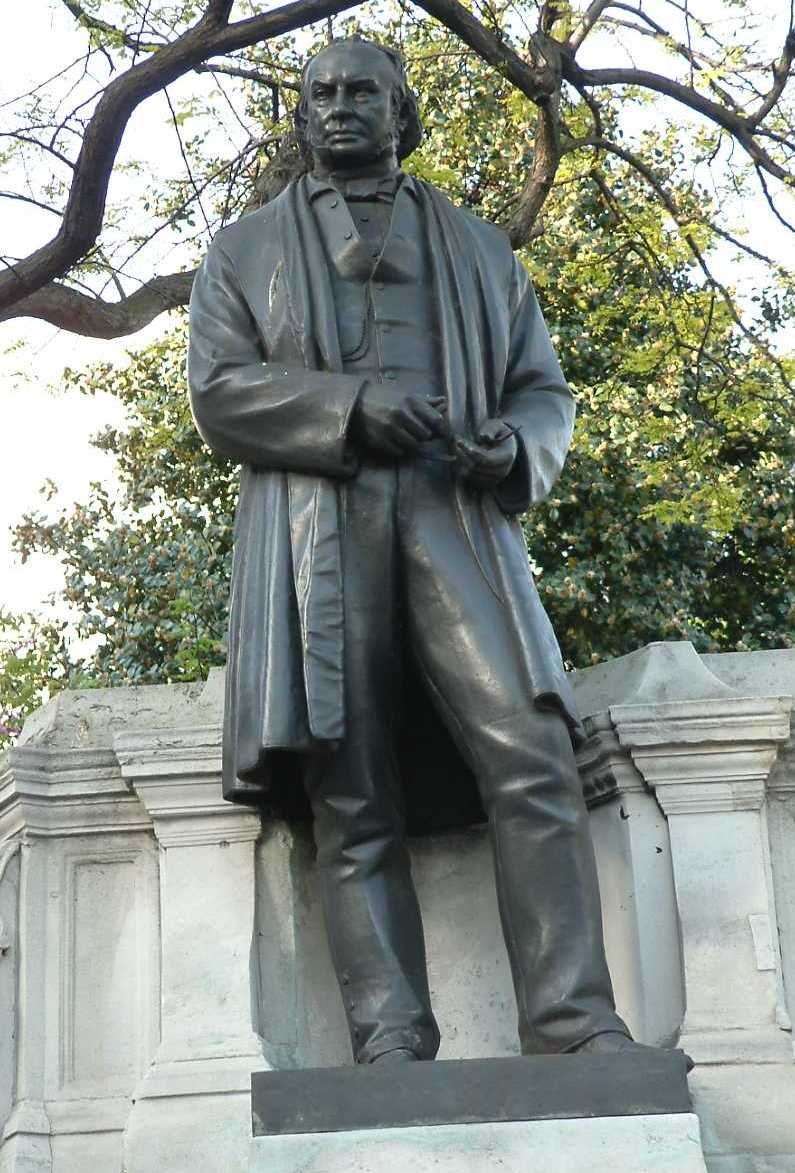
- The statue in May 2004
- Artist: Carlo Marochetti
- Year: c. 1877
- Medium: Bronze sculpture
- Subject: Isambard Kingdom Brunel
- Designation: Grade II
- Location: London, United Kingdom; 51.5108°N 0.1152°W

A bronze statue of Isambard Kingdom Brunel, also known as Brunel Monument or the Isambard Brunel Monument, by Carlo Marochetti, stands on the Victoria Embankment in London, England, at the west end of Temple Place. The statue rests on a Portland stone pedestal, with flanking screens and benches, by the architect Richard Norman Shaw.

== Description ==
The 8 ft (2.4 m) 2.45m bronze statue portrays Brunel standing casually, bareheaded, with his left leg slightly forward. The figure wears contemporary Victorian dress of frock coat, waistcoat, shirt, bow tie, and trousers, with a pair of dividers in his hands, but without the characteristic top hat or cigar in the widely recognised 1857 photograph. He gazes upstream under the arches of Waterloo Bridge towards Hungerford Bridge, although Brunel's Hungerford Bridge was removed in 1860 and the chains used to complete Clifton Suspension Bridge.

The tall square Portland stone pedestal has flanking walls topped with scrolls incorporating benches below was commissioned from Shaw, and bears the inscription "ISAMBARD KINGDOM BRUNEL/ CIVIL ENGINEER/ BORN 1806 DIED 1859".

== Background ==
A memorial committee of the Institute of Civil Engineers commissioned the sculpture in 1860, some months after Brunel's death on 14 September 1859. While protracted discussions continued about an appropriate site to erect it and other statues, the bronze statue was completed in 1864 and kept in storage, and Marochetti died in 1867.

The Institute of Civil Engineers had also commissioned Marochetti to make a similar statue of Brunel's rival engineer Robert Stephenson, who died a few weeks after Brunel on 12 October 1859, and then a third statue for the railway engineer Joseph Locke who died a year later, on 18 September 1860. The intention was to erect the three statues together in a prominent position in Parliament Square, then known as the churchyard of St Margaret's, Westminster, near the statue of George Canning beside the offices of the Institute of Civil Engineers at One Great George Street. After initially granting permission, the Office of Works decided against in 1868, reserving the space for statues of politicians.

Ultimately the three statues were erected separately. Marochetti's statue of Joseph Locke was installed in Locke Park, Barnsley, in 1866. The statue and its enclosure were listed at Grade II in 1986. A copy is displayed in Barentin, France, where Locke designed a railway viaduct. The statue of Robert Stephenson was donated to the London and North Western Railway, and installed on a red granite pedestal outside Euston railway station in 1871. The statue in the station forecourt is one of few surviving elements of the original station after it was redeveloped in the 1960s, and it was listed at Grade II in 1974.

== Installation ==
For Brunel's statue, Shaw was commissioned to design a stone pedestal. His design, with novel flanking walls creating a screen, was accepted in 1874, and the pedestal was completed and the statue installed in 1877. (The National Portrait Gallery has a half-plate negative photograph of the statue by Elliott & Fry which they date to 1857, although the plinth shows Brunel's date of death in 1859.)

The statue became a grade II listed building in 1958. The statue and screen were restored in 1950, repairing damage caused by both the weather and by enemy action during the Second World War.

== Copies ==
A bronze resin copy of Marochetti's statue was unveiled in 1973 in Havelock Square, Swindon, mounted on a tall cylindrical granite plinth with wider rim, resembling a smokestack or top hat, on the opening of the first stage of the Brunel shopping centre. It was reinstalled after building works in 2018.

A half-length bust of the statue is installed beside North Street, Saltash, looking east towards the Brunel's Royal Albert Bridge and the Tamar Bridge.

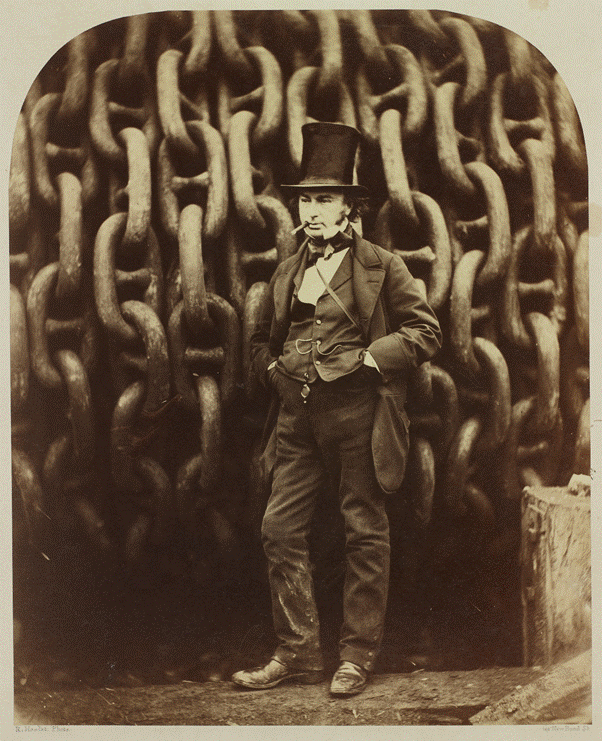
Photograph of Brunel in 1857

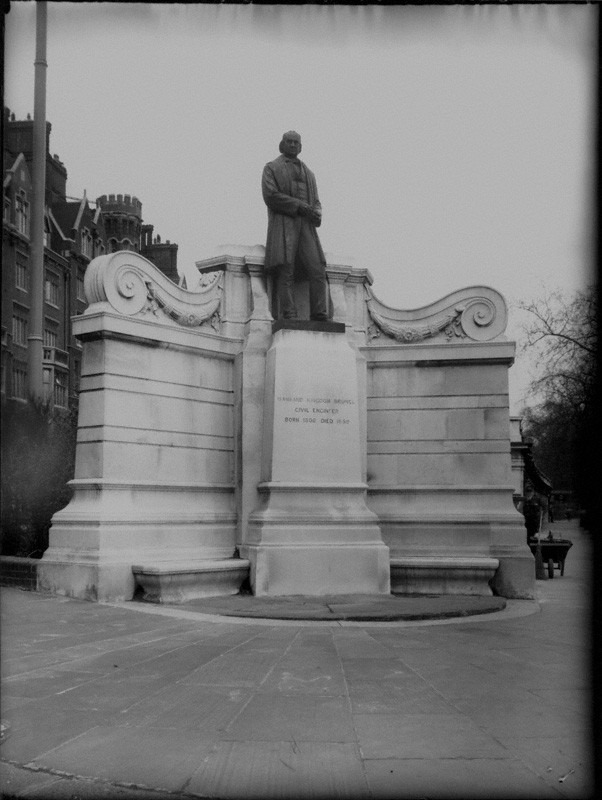
Marochetti statue of Brunel, 1857 [sic]

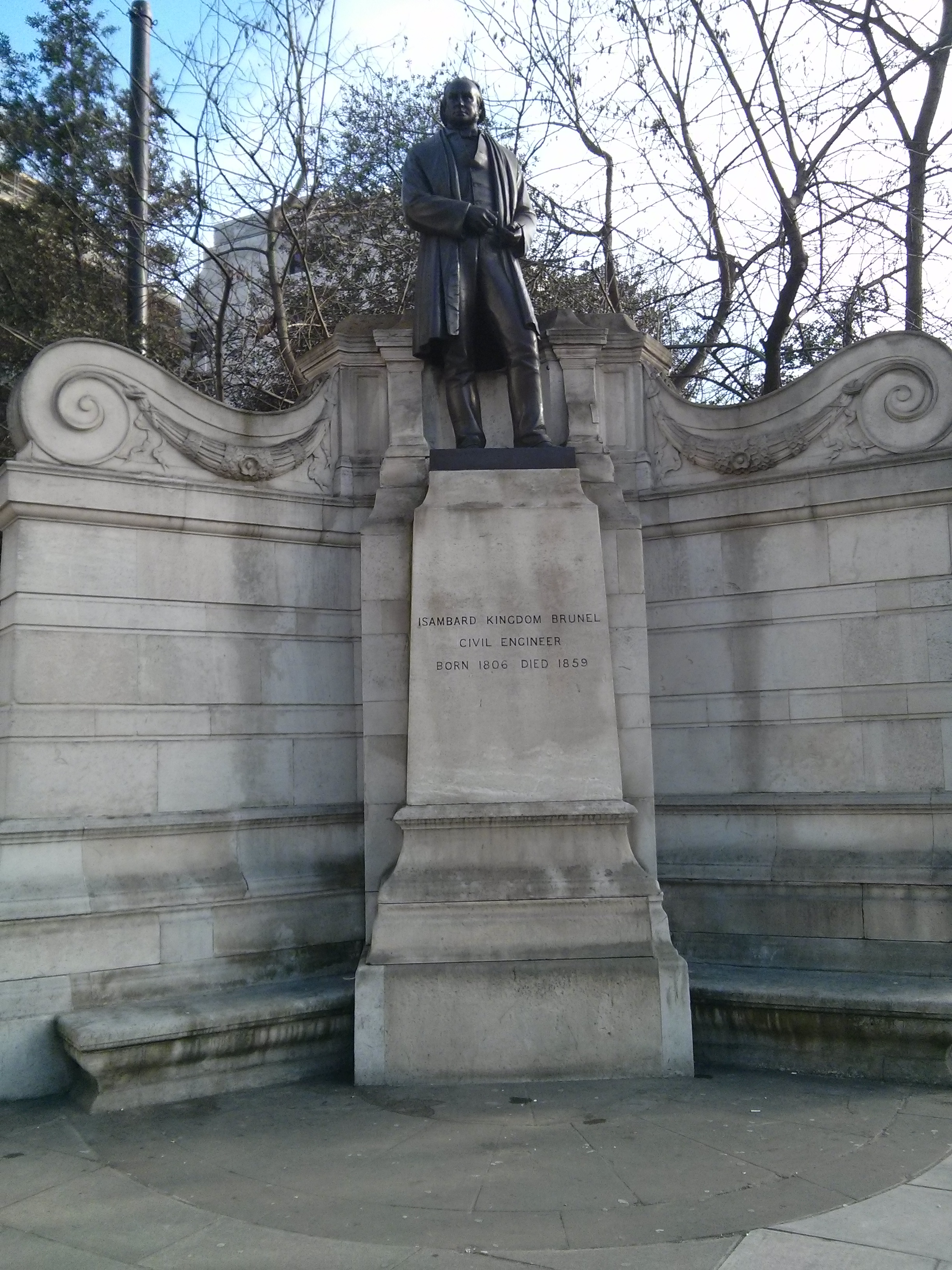
Brunel statue in 2014

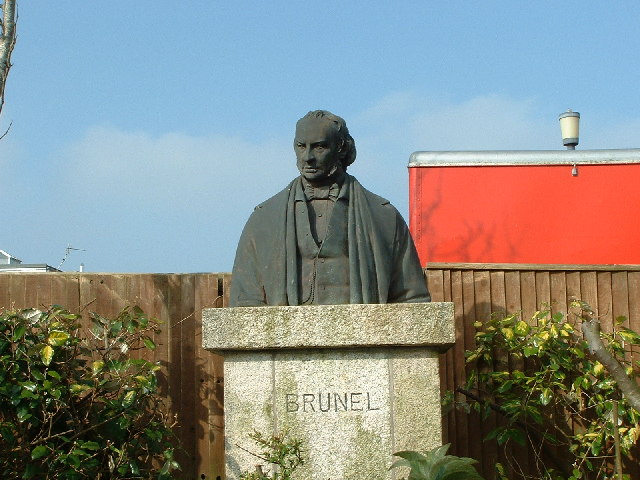
Bust in Saltash in 2003

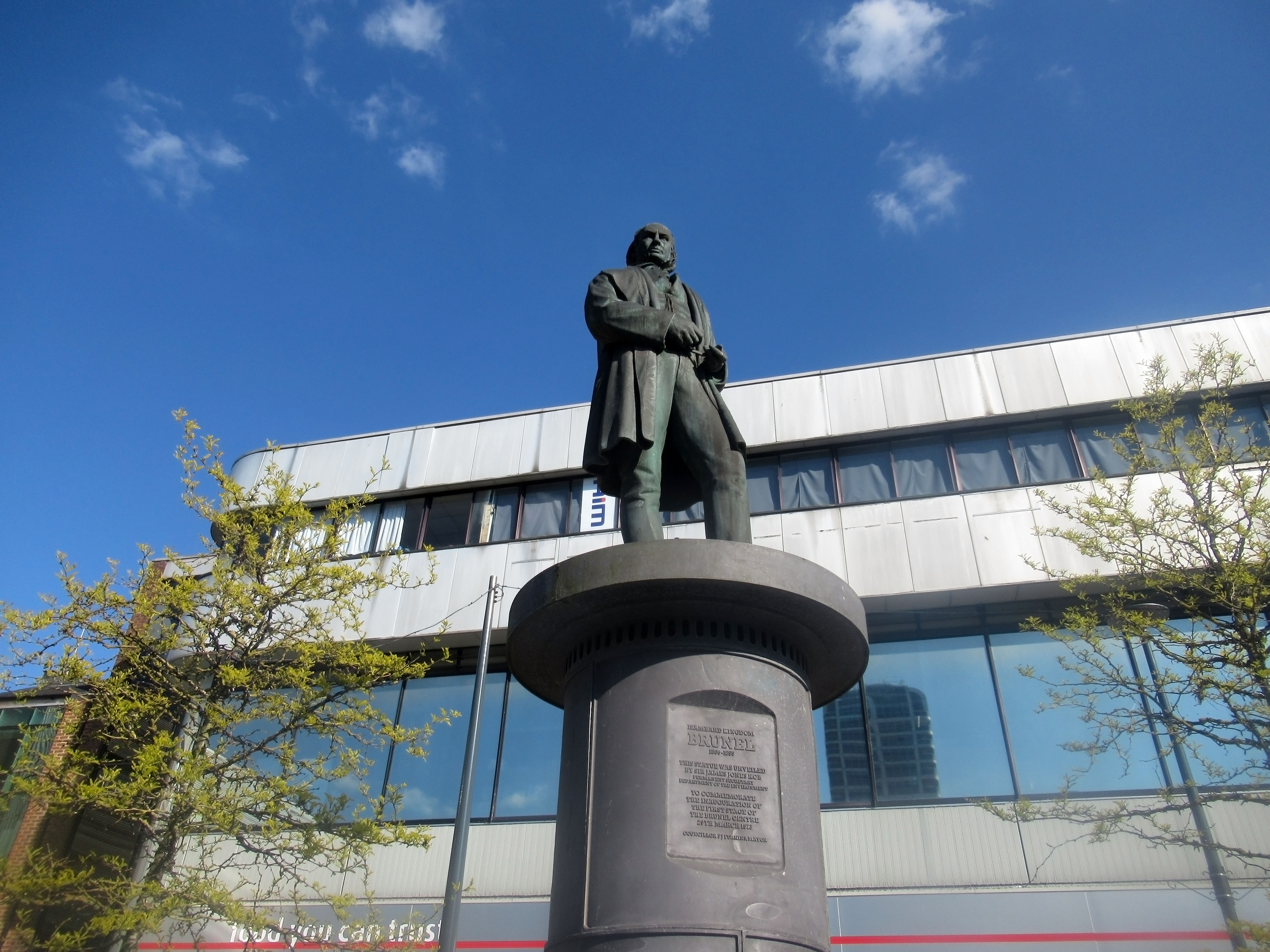
Modern replica of the Brunel statue in Swindon in 2018

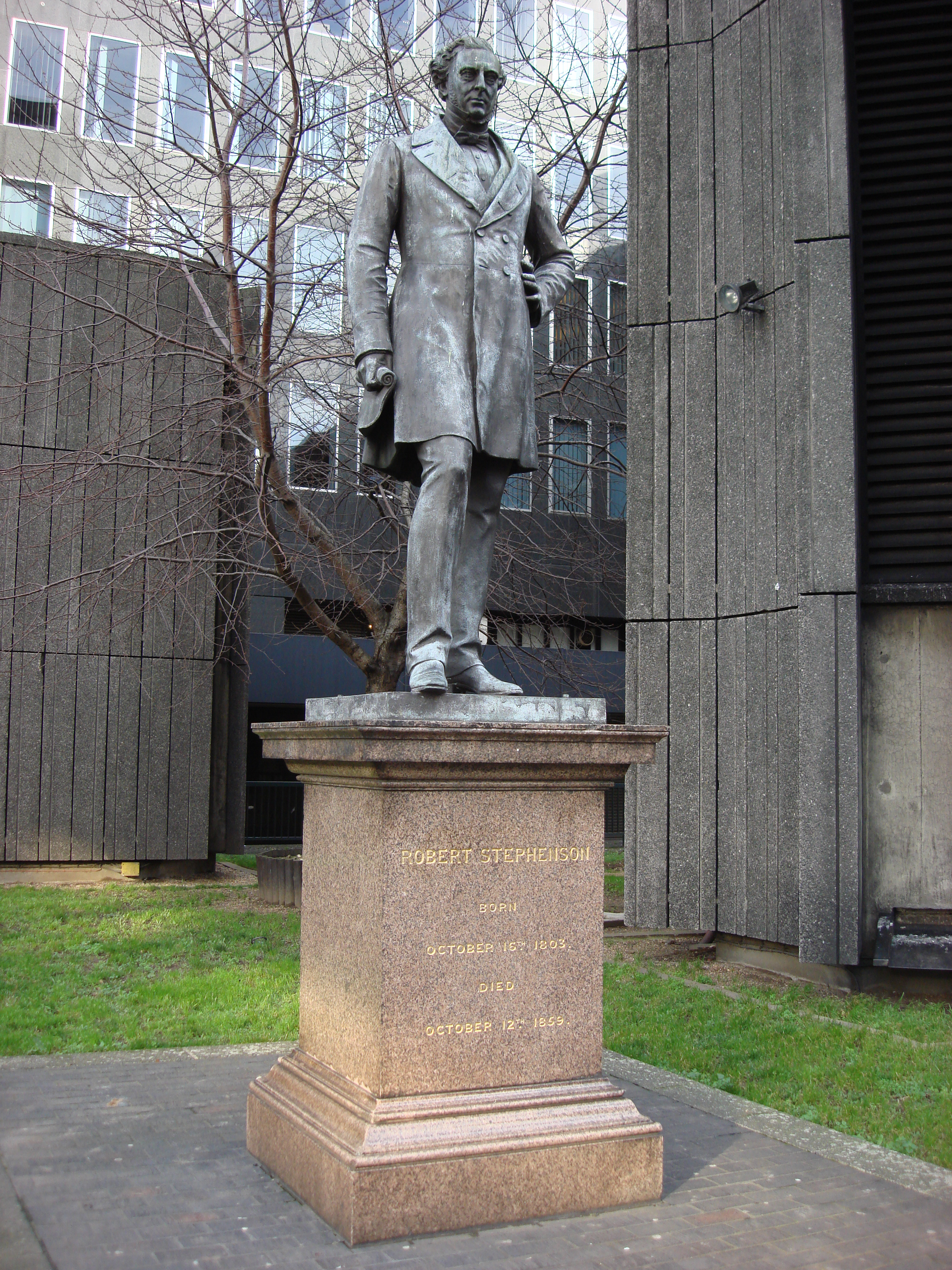
Marochetti's bronze statue of Robert Stephenson was erected at Euston station in 1870; pictured in 2007

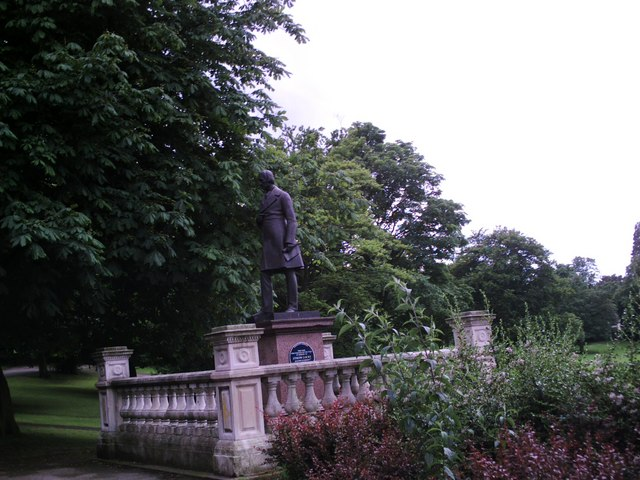
Statue of Joseph Locke, in Locke Park, Barnsley, in 2007
