= Richard the Lionheart (disambiguation) =

Richard the Lionheart was King Richard I of England.

Richard the Lionheart may also refer to:

- Richard the Lionheart (TV series), ITV production (1962–63)
- Richard the Lion-Hearted (1923 film), starring Wallace Beery
- Richard the Lionheart (2013 film), starring Gregory Chandler

== See also ==
- Richard Coeur de Lion (disambiguation)
