= Hemery (surname) =

Hemery or Hémery is a surname that originated in France. It may refer to:

== People with the surname Hemery ==
- Calvin Hemery (born 1995), French tennis player
- David Hemery (born 1944), British track and field athlete
- Gabriel Hemery (born 1968), English forest scientist
- Thérèse Eléonore Lingée (née Thérèse-Éléonore Hémery; c. 1750–1818) French engraver
- Thony Hemery (born 1972), French freestyle skier
- Victor Hémery (1876–1950), French racecar driver

== See also ==
- Hemery (disambiguation)
