= Statue of Robert Stephenson =

Sculpture by Carlo Marochetti

Coordinates: 51.5277°N 0.1333°W

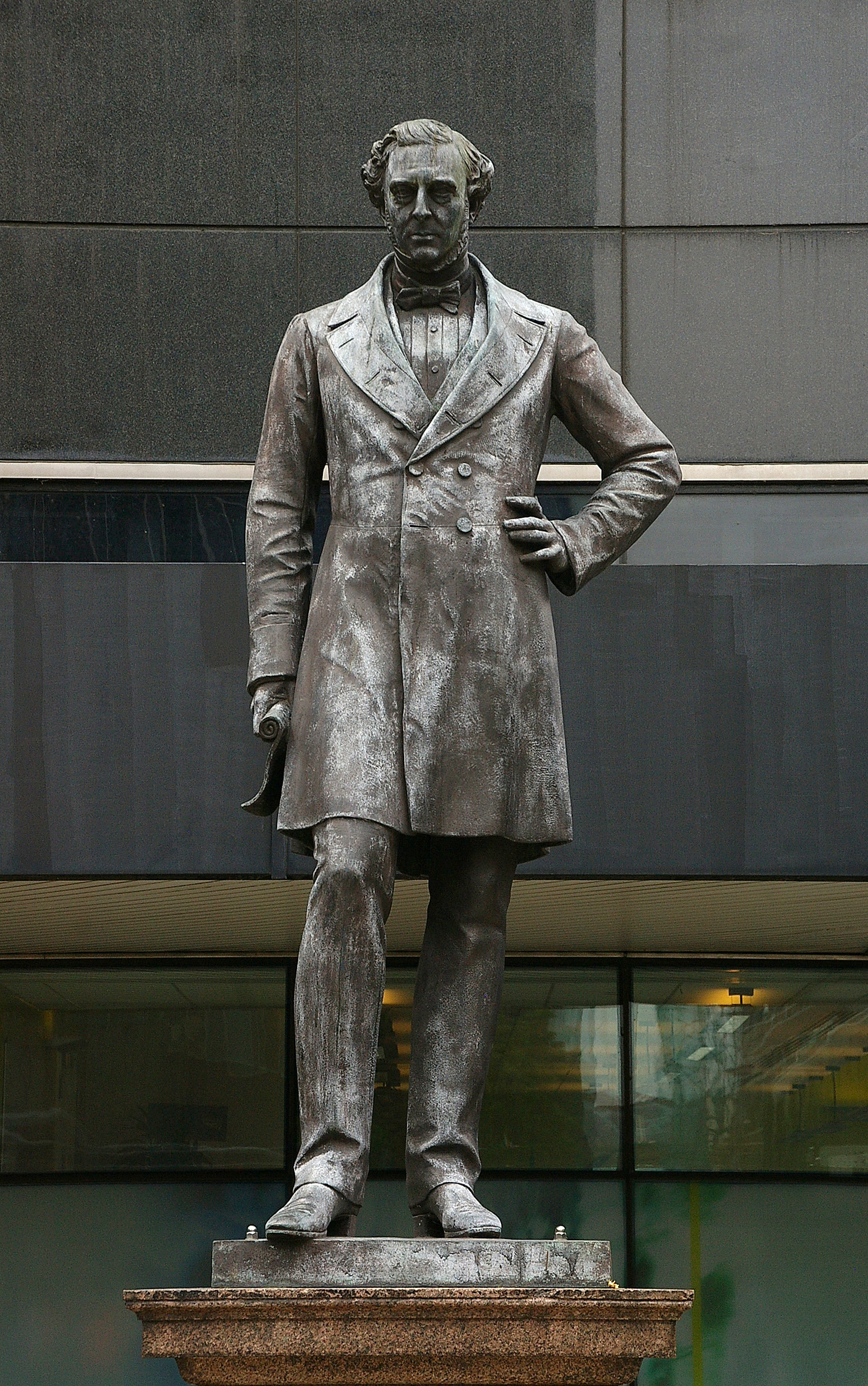
- Artist: Carlo Marochetti
- Medium: Bronze
- Subject: Robert Stephenson
- Location: Euston station; London

Listed Building – Grade II
- Official name: Statue of Robert Stephenson in Euston Station Forecourt
- Designated: 14 May 1974
- Reference no.: 1342041

A bronze statue of Robert Stephenson by Carlo Marochetti usually stands on a red granite plinth in the forecourt of Euston railway station in London, England. Erected in 1871, it is one of few surviving elements of the original station after it was redeveloped in the 1960s, and it became a Grade II listed building in 1974. It was temporarily removed in 2020 to allow the station to be remodelled to accommodate the new High Speed 2 (HS2) railway line, and was installed at Locomotion Museum in Shildon, County Durham, in 2025.

== Description ==
The 2.7 m (8 ft 10 in) high bronze statue portrays Stephenson standing casually, bareheaded, with his right leg slightly forward, in contemporary Victorian dress of frock coat and trousers. He has a partially unrolled document in his right hand, and the left hand rests on his hip. The red Aberdeen granite plinth bears the inscription ROBERT STEPHENSON/ BORN/ OCTOBER 16^{TH} 1803/ DIED OCTOBER 12^{TH} 1859.

== Background ==
A memorial committee of the Institute of Civil Engineers commissioned the statue after Stephenson's death on 12 October 1859. It was completed before Marochetti's death in 1867, but remained in storage while protracted discussions continued about an appropriate site to erect it and other statues.

The Institute of Civil Engineers had also commissioned Marochetti to make a similar statue of Stephenson's rival engineer Isambard Kingdom Brunel, after Brunel's death a few weeks before Stephenson on 14 September 1859, and then a third statue for the railway engineer Joseph Locke who died a year later, on 18 September 1860. The intention was to erect the three statues together in a prominent position in Parliament Square, then known as the churchyard of St Margaret's, Westminster, near the statue of George Canning beside the offices of the Institute of Civil Engineers at One Great George Street. After initially granting permission, the Office of Works decided against in 1868, reserving the space for statues of politicians.

Ultimately the three statues were erected separately. Marochetti's statue of Joseph Locke was installed in Locke Park, Barnsley, in 1866. The statue and its enclosure were listed at Grade II in 1986. A copy is displayed in Barentin, France, where Locke designed a railway viaduct. The statue of Brunel was erected in 1874 on the Victoria Embankment, at the west end of Temple Place, on a Portland stone pedestal with novel flanking screen walls and benches by the architect Richard Norman Shaw. It became a grade II listed building in 1958.

== Installation at Euston station ==
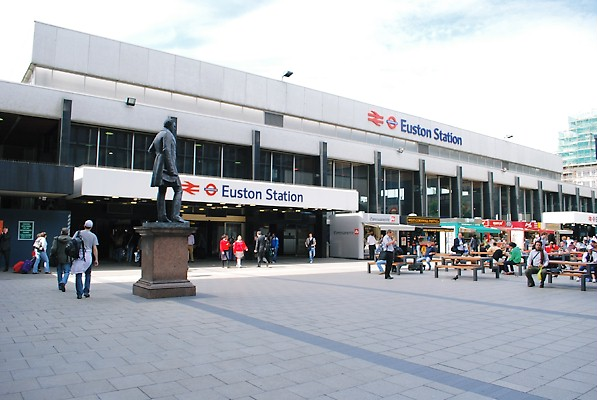
The statue outside Euston station, 2009

The Institute of Civil Engineers presented the statue of Stephenson to the London and North Western Railway, which from 1846 brought together the London and Birmingham Railway, the Grand Junction Railway and the Liverpool and Manchester Railway, all of which had engaged Stephenson or his father George Stephenson. Euston was the railway's London terminus, and an 1852 marble statue of George Stephenson by Edward Hodges Baily was already displayed within the main hall of the station (it is now at the National Railway Museum, York). Similar to Marochetti's statue of Robert Stephenson, Baily's statue of his father also shows the subject standing in contemporary dress, holding a partially unrolled document the right hand.

The statue of Robert Stephenson was erected on a red granite pedestal outside Euston railway station in 1871, originally sited between the entrance lodges to the station precincts. It was moved to the east side of the station when it was redeveloped in the 1960s, and moved again in 2008 when further redevelopment was proposed to stand to the west side of the station forecourt. The statue is one of few surviving elements of the original station after it was redeveloped in the 1960s, and it was listed at Grade II in 1974.

The statue was removed in 2020 to allow further redevelopment works, remodelling the station for the new HS2 railway line to Birmingham. In April 2025 the statue was put on display at Locomotion Museum in Shildon, County Durham, where it is expected to remain for ten years before returning to Euston.

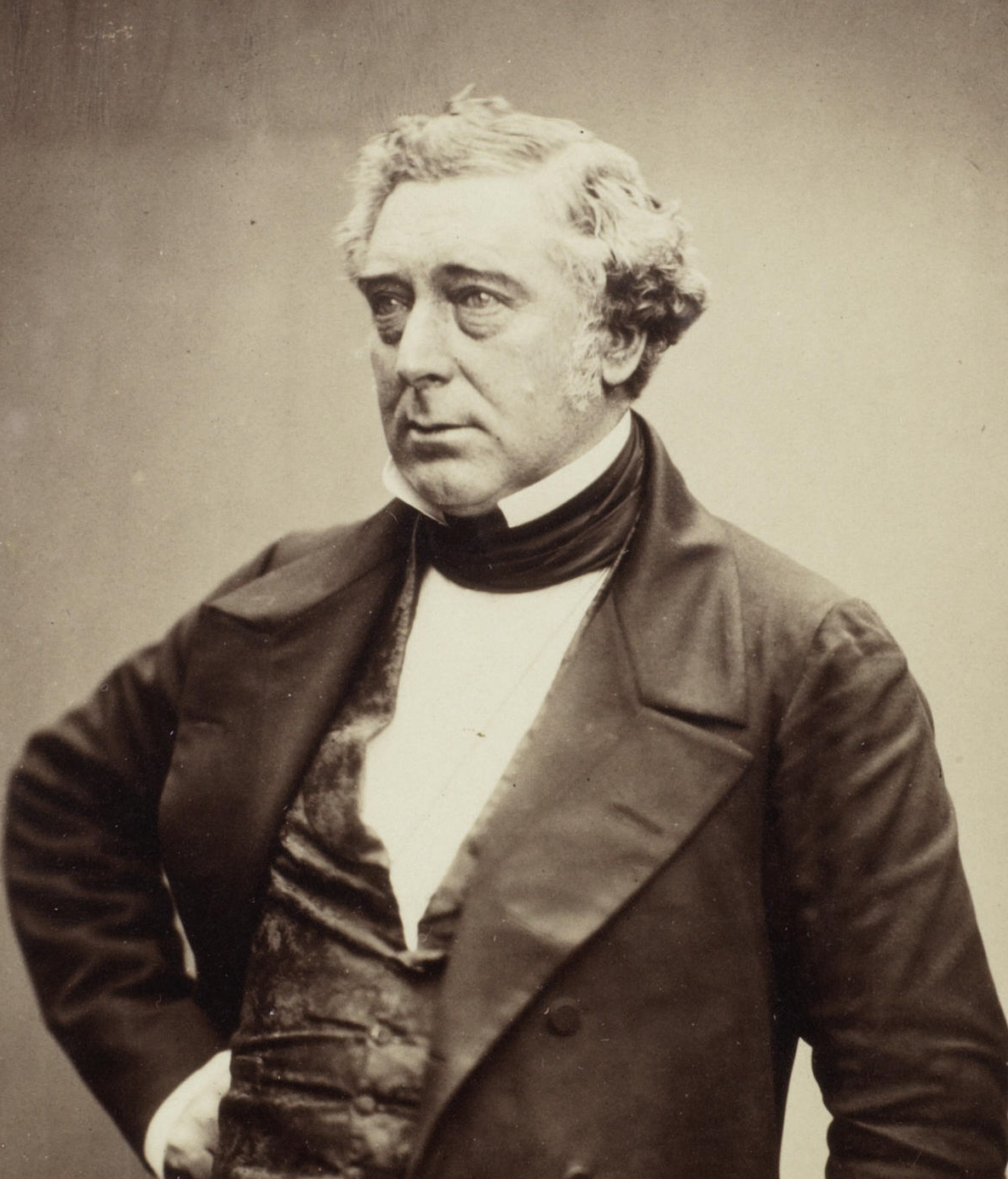
Photograph of Robert Stephenson in 1856

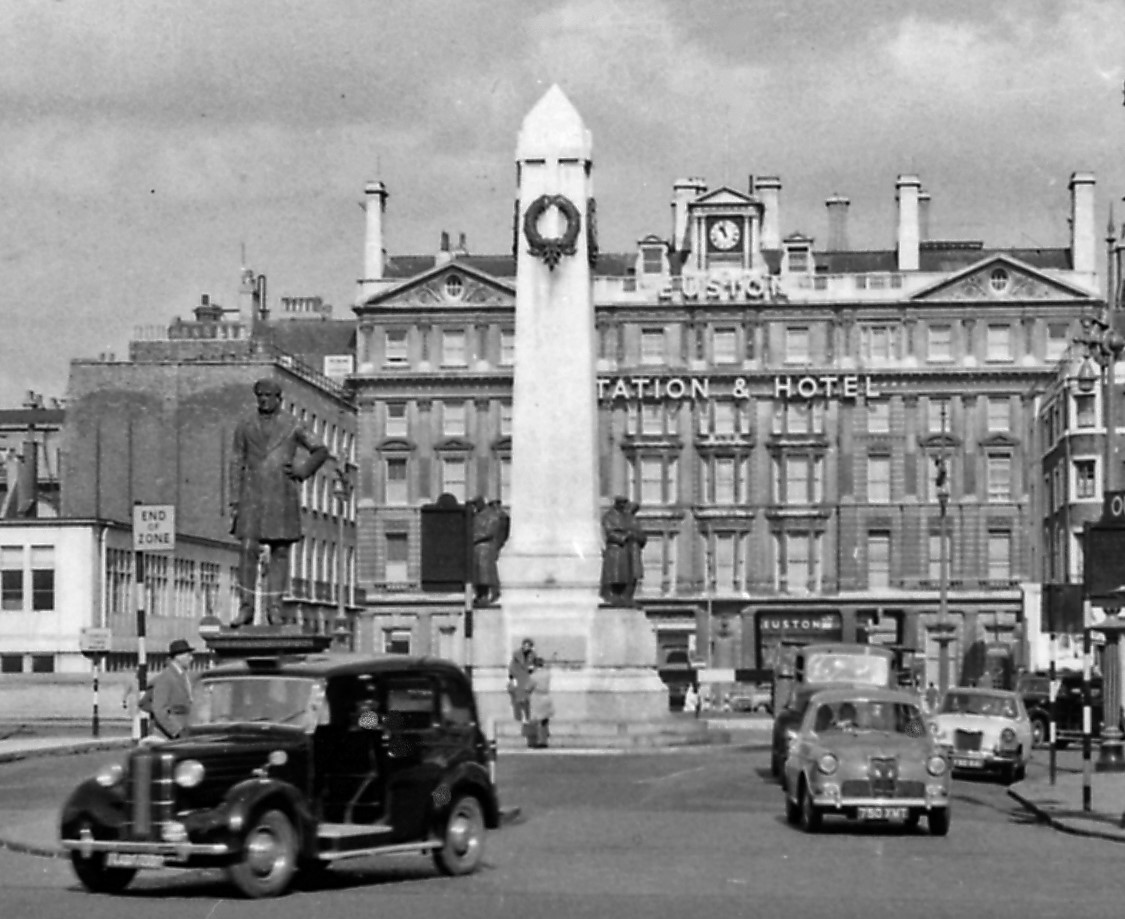
Robert Stephenson's statue in its original position in 1962 after the arch had been removed

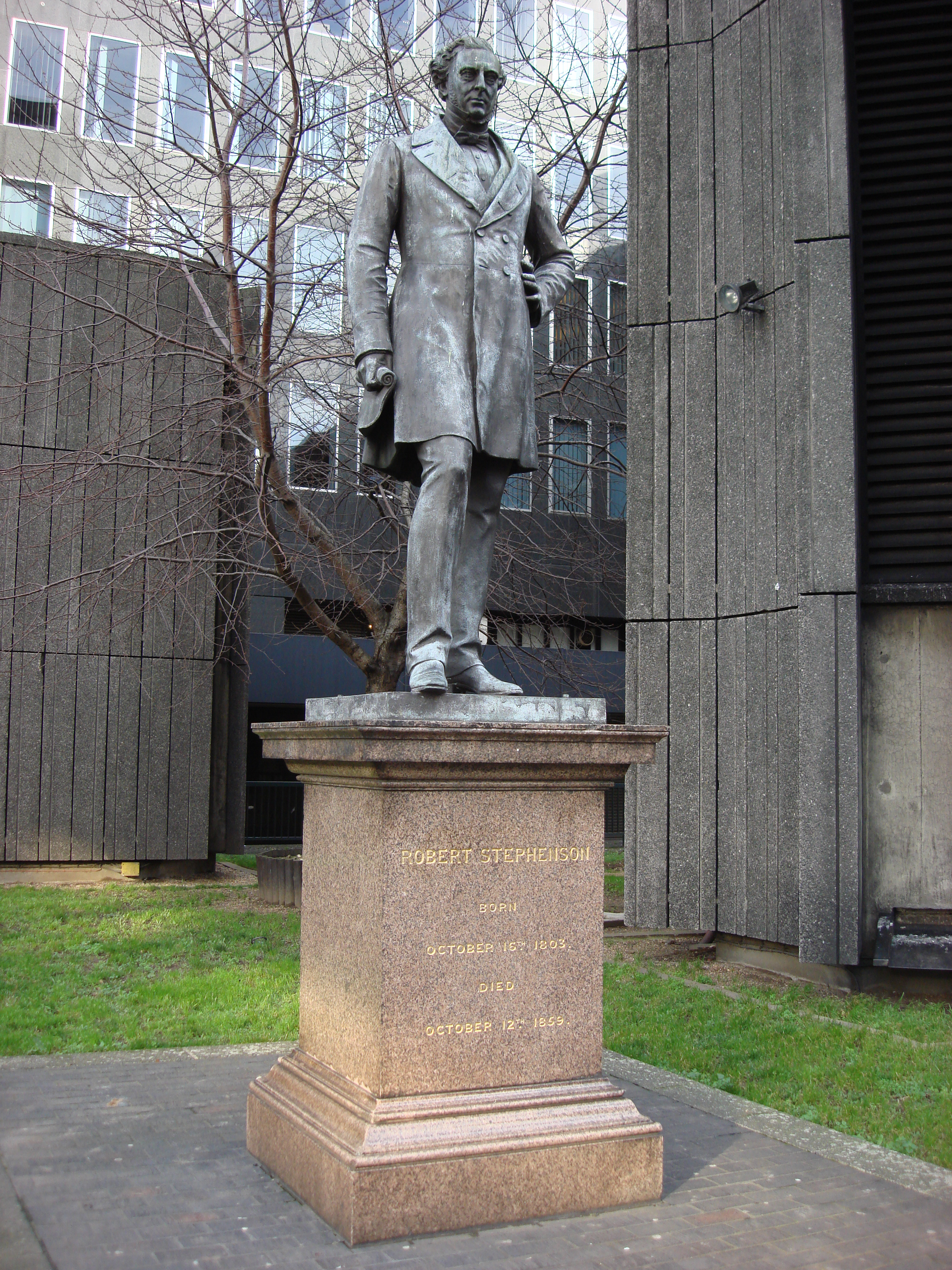
Robert Stephenson's statue in its previous position outside Euston station, 2007

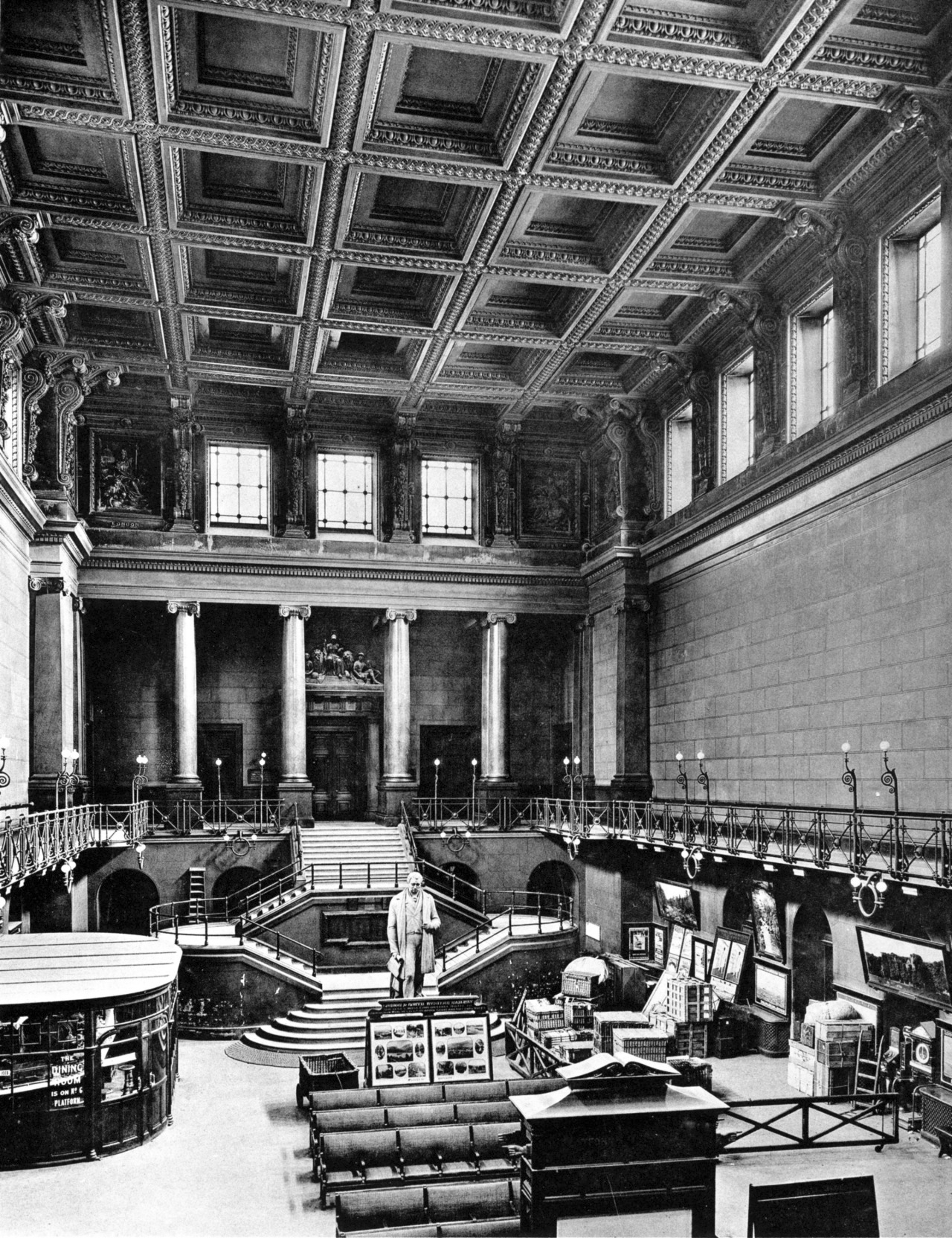
Marble statue of George Stephenson in the hall of the old Euston Station, 1914

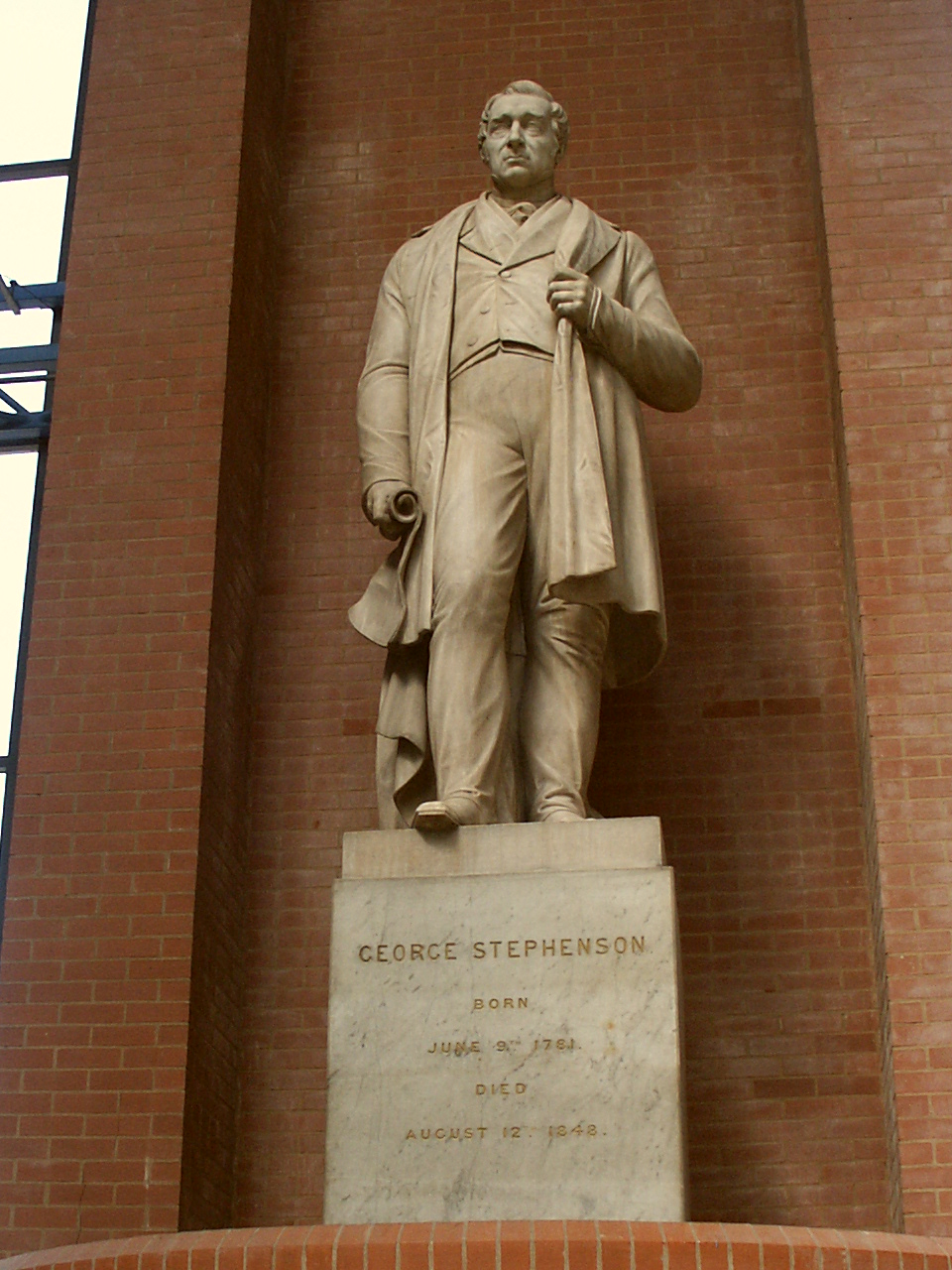
Statue of George Stephenson, now at the National Railway Museum, York, pictured in 2008
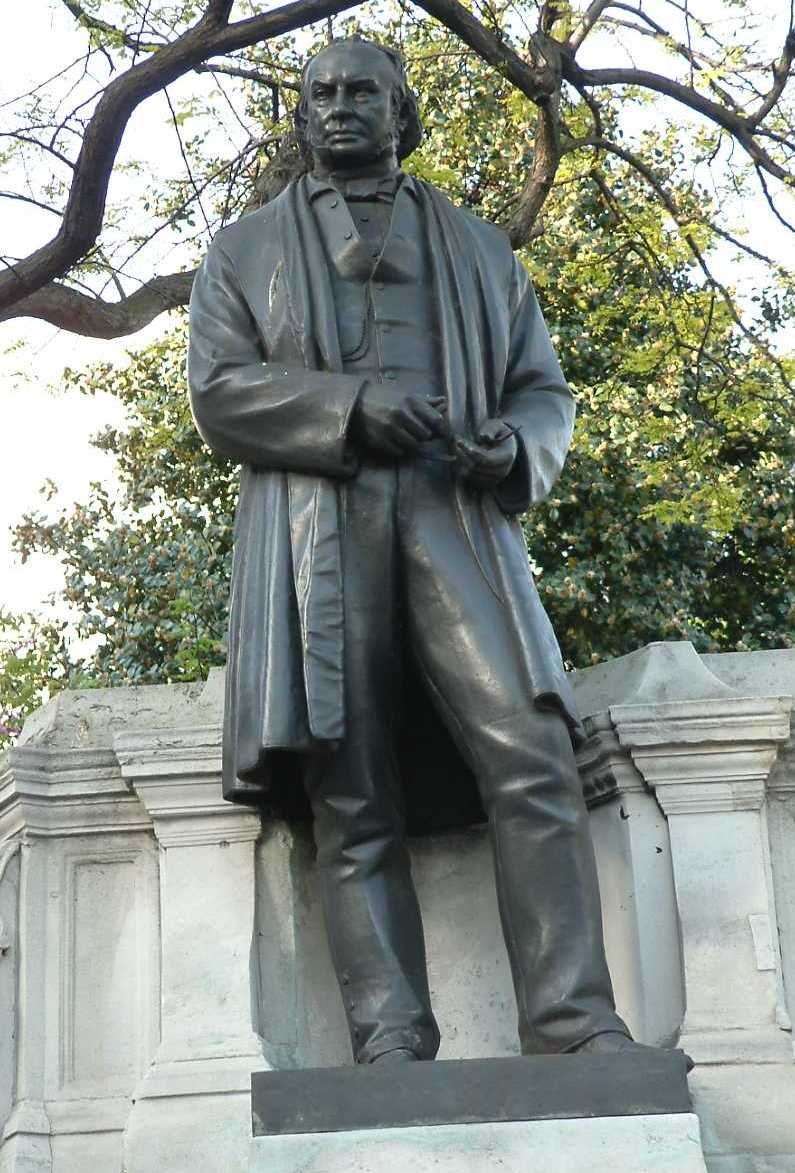
Statue of Brunel, 2004

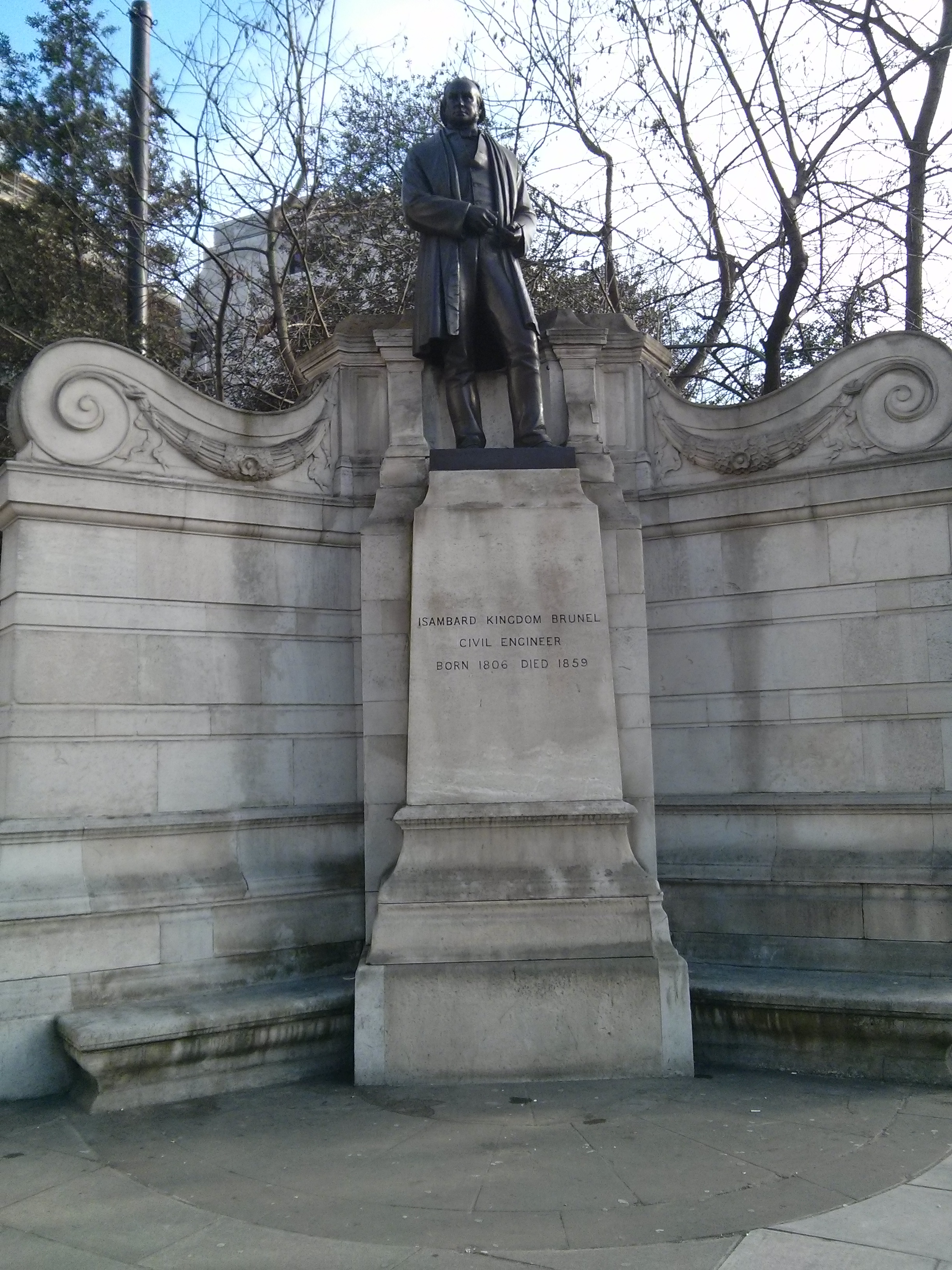
Brunel statue in 2014

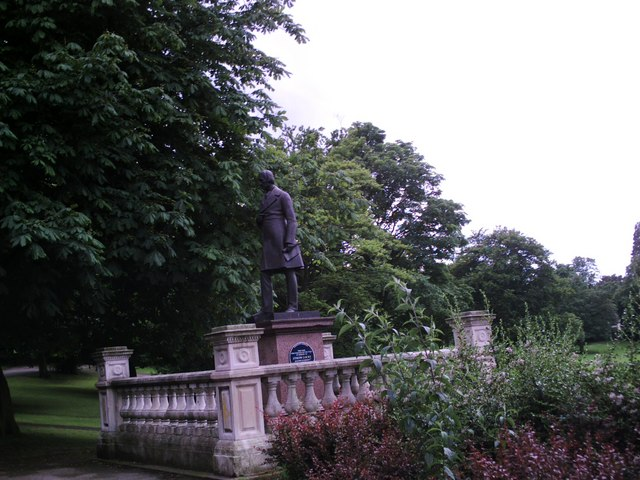
Statue of Joseph Locke, in Locke Park, Barnsley, in 2007
