= Louis-Joseph Francœur =

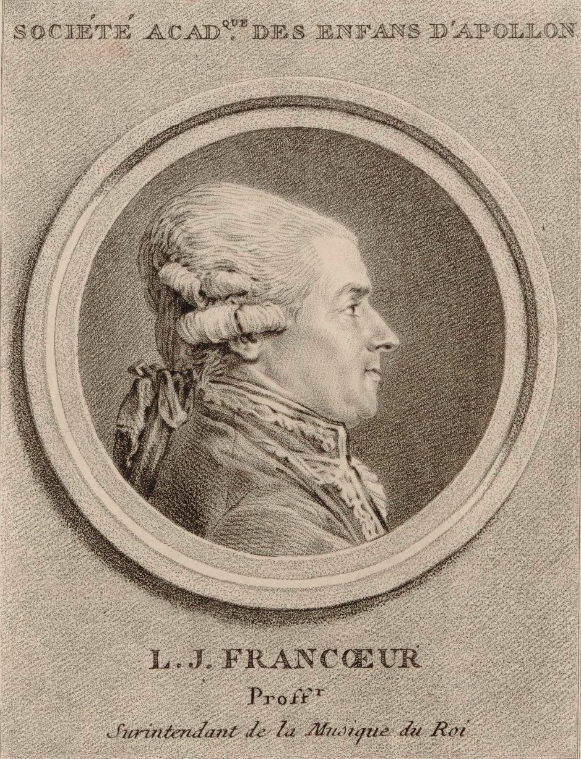
Louis Joseph Francœur in 1780. Engraving by Thérèse Eléonore Lingée after a drawing by Jean-Michel Moreau.

Louis-Joseph Francœur (8 October 1738 – 10 March 1804) was a French violinist, composer, and administrator of the Opéra de Paris.

== Biography ==
Born in Paris, the son of composer Louis Francoeur, he was raised by his uncle François Francœur following the death of his father in 1745. He became violin of the Opera in 1742, master of music at the Opera between 1764 and 1779, director and conductor of the Opera, then director of the Opera until 1790.

The French Revolution disrupted his career and led to his ruin. In 1792, he founded a company to take over the privilege of the Opera, but was imprisoned in 1793–94. He directed the Opera in 1799, but died in 1804, isolated, forgotten and highly indebted.

Louis-Joseph Francœur is the father of Louis-Benjamin Francœur (1773-1849), a mathematician.

Francœur left some tunes and arranged others' music. He wrote theoretical essays, including the Diapason général de tous les instruments à vent (1772).

He died in Paris on 10 March 1804.

== Bibliography ==
- Marcelle Benoit (dir.), "Louis-Joseph Francœur", Dictionnaire de la musique en France aux XVII et XVIIIe, Fayard, 1992 ISBN 2-213-02824-9
