= Francoeur (surname) =

Francoeur is a surname. Notable people with the surname include:

- François Francoeur (1698–1787), French violinist and composer
- Jacques Francœur (1925–2005), businessman and journalist of Quebec
- Jeff Francoeur (born 1984), Major League Baseball player
- Joseph-Napoléon Francoeur (1880–1965), politician and lawyer of Quebec
- Louis-Benjamin Francoeur (1773–1849), French mathematicus
- Louis-Joseph Francœur (1738–1804), French violinist and composer, nephew of François and father of Louis-Benjamin
- Lucien Francoeur (born 1948), singer and poet of Quebec
- Raymond Francoeur (born 1946), Canadian politician
- Richard Francœur (1894–1971), French actor
