= Ramon Picarte Mujica =

Chilean scientist

Manuel Felipe Ramón Picarte Mujica
- Born: Santiago, Chile
- Died: France
- Education: General José Miguel Carrera National Institute
- Alma mater: University of Chile
- Spouse: Clorinda Pardo
- Scientific career
- Fields: Mathematics
- Thesis: "The importance of life insurance, and related projects susceptibles of application in Chile" (Importancia de la Institución de Seguros de la Vida, y proyectos sobre el particular que son susceptibles de establecerse en Chile) (1862)

Manuel Felipe Ramón Picarte Mujica, better known as Ramón Picarte Mujica (9 June 1830 – 1884?) was a Chilean scientist.

== Early life ==
Picarte was born on 9 June 1830, to father Ramon Picarte and mother Carmen Mujica. His father, a colonel in the independence army, had an outstanding career under the command of José Miguel Carrera: he took part in many of the actions that led to Chilean independence, became commander of the garrison of Valparaíso, and later mayor of Valdivia. As a liberal in the newly formed nation, he opposed Diego Portales, who he considered authoritarian and elitist. As a result of this, he was expelled from the army and died in poverty in 1830. The temperament of his father would later find expression in Picarte.

=== Education ===
Little is known of Picarte's early education. The subjects studied in Chile at the time were reading, writing, Christian doctrine, arithmetic (addition, subtraction, division, multiplication) and morality and etiquette. That was considered more than enough for ordinary citizens.

His secondary education was better. At the time, secondary education in Chile was divided in two basic courses: humanities (intended for future lawyers) and mathematics (for future surveyors). The former was a longer course but gave a more promising future.

Picarte studied in one of the most prestigious and old state schools in Chile, the General José Miguel Carrera National Institute from 1840. Some of his classmates would become illustrious figures, including Guillermo, Joaquín and Alberto Blest Gana; Víctor and Miguel Luis Amunátegui; Diego Barros Arana, one of the fathers of Chilean historiography; Eusebio Lillo, poet and the composer of the national anthem, and Pedro León Gallo Goyenechea, a prominent politician.

Picarte began his studies on the humanities course, but soon after finishing the Roman law module, he switched to maths. Fortunately for him, he had an excellent maths teacher in Andrés Antonio Gorbea. For Professor Gorbea, maths was an essential part of education and should not be limited to the requirements of future surveyors. He based his teaching on the book "A complete course of pure mathematics" by Louis Benjamin Francoeur, a professor of the French Academy of Sciences. Picarte had lectures on topics including analytic geometry, probability theory, algebra, series, differential calculus and integral. He obtained a degree as surveyor in 1852.

== Career ==
=== Early work ===
In 1854, Picarte became a mathematics professor at the military academy of the Chilean Army. In those days, mathematics was dependent on mathematical tables, which were as important for mathematicians as computers are today. There were just a few limited division and multiplication tables available in Chile at the time. Picarte extended those tables to include numbers up to 10,000, and in doing, greatly improved the accuracy and reach of the tables.

He translated and improved the most commonly used logarithm tables in Chile, and invented a new way of calculating divisions by creating a table that allowed mathematicians to divide any number up to 10,000 with a simple sum. He also improved the Lalande algorithm tables which were widely used by engineers, architects, surveyors, merchants, or anyone needing to solve complex mathematical problems.

Picarte asked other Chilean mathematicians examine his work but did not receive an enthusiastic response. He tried to sell the copyrights for it at a very low price so that it could be published and distributed, but was unable to find a buyer. He then applied for support from the government but received the same response as from his peers: indifference and incredulity. This may have been because there were very few mathematicians in Chile at the time able to review or check his work. Lalande, who had produced the existing, widely distributed algorithm tables, was also a famous French astronomer and mathematician, so there was some resistance to replacing them with something new.

Essentially, Picarte's work did not align with the needs of president Manuel Montt’s development project for the newly born nation. There were no government financial support for scientific or mathematical research, and Lalande's existing tables were sufficient for Pedro José Amadeo Pissis’s work on topographical maps and for the astronomical studies carried out by Carlos Moesta, director of the newly created Santa Lucía Hill observatory.

=== Success in ===
Confident in the value of his invention despite the lack of recognition in Chile, Picarte decided to leave his homeland. He travelled to Peru in 1857, where he also failed to find a publisher. He stayed for two months taking on whatever casual work he could find, and begged his Chilean acquaintances for money to continue onwards, first to Panama, and then to Southampton, England. Once in England, sold his watch in order to complete the last leg of his journey to France.

In Paris, with no more than his tables and the clothes on his back, he followed the advice of other mathematicians and spent 5 months reviewing and compiling his work in order to present it to the French Academy of Sciences. He finally presented his work on 15 February 1859 and received warm praise from the academics. The report of this session was signed by famous members of the academy, Mathieu, Bienaymé and Charles Hermite. Picarte's mathematical tables were welcomed in Europe. He stayed in France for some time and received some income from selling the copyright of his work. Soon, the government of Chile realized of the magnitude of his achievement and offered him official recognition and a cash prize via the consulate in France.

=== Return to Chile ===
Picarte returned to Chile in 1862. In October of that year he joined the Faculty of Physics and Maths at the University of Chile, although he didn't teach classes until the beginning of 1890. Free of financial problems, he dedicated his life to his studies. He patented three inventions: A siphon pump, a steam siphon and a steam reciprocating pump.

When he returned to Chile, Picarte was preoccupied with the social problems that he saw around him. In France he had learned about the socialist ideas of Charles Fourier, cousin of famous mathematician François Marie Charles Fourier. These ideas had a great impact on him, and he dedicated himself to helping to solve Chile's welfare issues.

Observing the conditions in his own country and comparing them to what was happening in Europe, Picarte developed an interesting theory that he incorporated to his university thesis, called: "The importance of life insurance, and related projects which are likely to be established in Chile" (Importancia de la Institución de Seguros de la Vida, y proyectos sobre el particular que son susceptibles de establecerse en Chile) In his thesis, Picarte expressed his views as follows: "If this horrible state of things (misery) is a necessity in that sad European civilization, sustained only by poverty and selfishness; in America, continent of new republics, and especially in Chile, where the arteries of blundering speculation are not yet formed or solidified, it would be an eternal shame if we (society) can do something about it and don’t." In this report, Picarte criticizes the economic system and sets out the basis of the scientific approach to a future social program in Chile, after seeing how those organizations operate in Europe. Through mathematics, he proposes that it is scientifically proven that these social institutions are possible ("es un hecho matemáticamente probado que son posibles").

In the years that followed, Picarte dedicated himself to this project, though again, he received almost no support. But he was not just an intellectual: in 1863, he organized a union for tailors, and another for shoemakers. In 1864, he took his ideas to a larger scale with the "Sociedad Trabajo para Todos" (Society of Work for All), a production and mutual support organization with a people's savings bank, similar to a cooperative and organized according to his theories. His leaflets claimed that the organization would provide affordable and healthy food for everyone, eliminating intermediaries, and would reduce housing costs by sub-letting houses and rooms from other members of the organization at lower prices. The organization also promoted work, encouraging its members to produce and exchange goods within the organisation. Picarte expect the organization to produce some income, and with that, expand its benefits to other areas. In order to get capital for his plans, he waited in his office everyday from 12 to 3 to receive anyone who wanted to partner with him, but no-one supported or financed his project.

In 1865 Picarte obtained a degree in law and became a lawyer. His degree thesis discussed similar social issues and highlighted the need to organize state finances in order to be a truly independent nation.

"All that is needed is that want it, that we believe we are now capable of being such men; that we leave behind the sad concerns that have made us view what comes from that out-of-date Europe with a kind of respect.".

As a lawyer, Picarte offered his services for free to those who were unable to pay. He also wrote and published leaflets that explained the key rights enshrined in the Chilean Civil Code in simple words, putting them within reach of those with no knowledge of the law.

Around this time, Picarte moved to the southern Chilean town of San Carlos. Then, in 1866, he moved to Chillán, where in 1869 he married Clorinda Pardo, the daughter of a Chilean army colonel. It is not known if the couple had any children. He made the news again in 1883 when he published "Large logarithm tables to twelve decimal points" (Grandes Tablas de Logaritmos a doce decimales) in Chile and France, financed by the Chilean government. He then travelled back to France, after which there is no further record of him.

== Sources ==
- Almendras, Domingo, "Desarrollo de los estudios de Matemáticas en Chile antes de 1930", Folleto.
- Amunátegui Solar, Domingo, "Los primeros años del Instituto Nacional (1813–1835)", Santiago, Imprenta Cervantes, 1889.
- Amunátegui Solar, Domingo, "El Instituto Nacional bajo los rectorados de don Francisco Puente, don Manuel Montt y don Antonio Varas (1835–1845)", Santiago, Imprenta Cervantes, 1891.
- Barlow, Peter, "Tables of squares, cubes, square roots, cube roots and reciprocals of all integers up to 12,500," fourth edition, by L.J. Comrie, Chemical Publ. Co., New York, 1954. (First edition 1819).
- Bell, Eric T., "Los grandes matemáticos", Ed. Losada, 1948.
