= Carlo Marochetti =

Italian-born French sculptor (1805-1867)

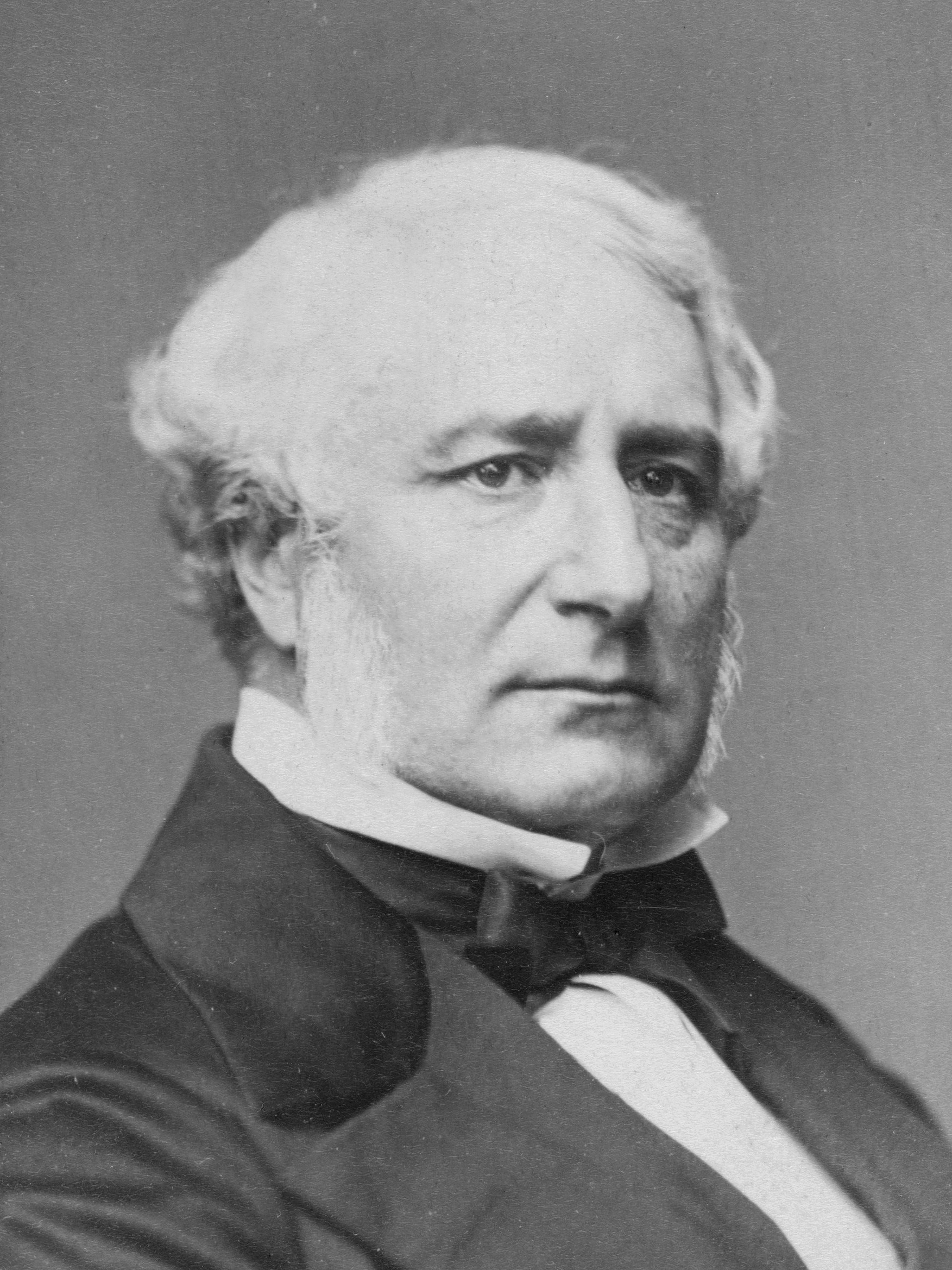
- Born: Pietro Carlo Giovanni Battista Marochetti; 14 January 1805; Turin, Italy
- Died: 29 December 1867 (aged 62); Passy, France
- Education: École des Beaux-Arts, Paris
- Known for: Sculpture, Public monuments

Baron Pietro Carlo Giovanni Battista Marochetti RA (14 January 1805 – 29 December 1867) was an Italian-born French sculptor who worked in France, Italy and Britain. He completed many public sculptures, often in a neo-classical style, plus reliefs, memorials and large equestrian monuments in bronze and marble. In 1848, Marochetti settled in England, where he received commissions from Queen Victoria. Marochetti received great recognition during his lifetime, being made a baron in Italy and awarded the Legion of Honour by the French government.

== Biography ==
=== Early life ===
Carlo Marochetti was born in Turin, where his father, Vincenzo, a former priest, was a local government official and professor of eloquence at Turin University, but after the family moved to Paris, Carlo was brought up as a French citizen. He studied at the Lycée Napoléon and then studied sculpture at the École des Beaux-Arts in Paris where his teachers were François Joseph Bosio and Antoine-Jean Gros. At the Paris Salon in 1827 he exhibited a marble statue of A Young Girl playing with a Dog which won a silver medal. Between 1822 and 1830 Marochetti frequently spent long periods in Rome where his mother was resident and where he collaborated with François-Joseph Duret and Antoine Étex and worked briefly at the studio of the Danish sculptor Bertel Thorvaldsen.

=== Career in France ===
From 1832 to 1848 Marochetti lived in Paris and largely adopted a neo-classical Romantic style of sculpture. He married Camille de Maussion in 1835 and together they had two sons and a daughter. In Paris, Marochetti received two significant commissions. One was for a relief panel of the Battle of Jemappes on the Arc de Triomphe and the other for a large marble statue group, the Elevation of Mary Magdalene for the altar of the Church of La Madeleine. He delayed completing the altar group to create a monumental equestrian statue of Emmanuel Philibert, Duke of Savoy which he donated to the city of Turin. The king of Sardinia, Charles Albert rewarded Marochetti for his gift by making him a baron. Before being sent to Italy the Philibert statue was displayed in the courtyard of the Louvre Palace during 1838. This effectively established Marochetti's reputation for creating equestrian monuments and led to him being commissioned to create such a statue of Ferdinand, Duke of Orleans, which stood in the courtyard of the Louvre for four years. In 1839 the French government awarded him the Legion of Honour. During 1840 Marochetti was competing to win both the commission for a monument to the Duke of Wellington for the city of Glasgow and for the commission to design the tomb of Napoleon for Les Invalides in Paris. Although he won the Glasgow commission, Marochetti's proposal for the tomb attracted widespread public criticism in France and was rejected.

When his father died, Marochetti inherited the family château at Vaux-sur-Seine outside of Paris and served as mayor of the town there from 1846. After the fall of the July Monarchy in 1848, and his subsequent failure to win a seat in the National Assembly, Marochetti followed the French king Louis-Philippe into exile in the United Kingdom.

=== Career in London ===
Marochetti spent the greater part of his time from 1848 until his death, in London. He lived on Onslow Square, and maintained a large studio and his own foundry in the adjacent Sydney Mews. In his studio, Marochetti created an equestrian statue, in plaster, of Richard Coeur de Lion which was displayed at the Great Exhibition during 1851. A public campaign led to a bronze copy being made which was eventually, in 1860, erected in front of the Palace of Westminster on the orders of Prince Albert.

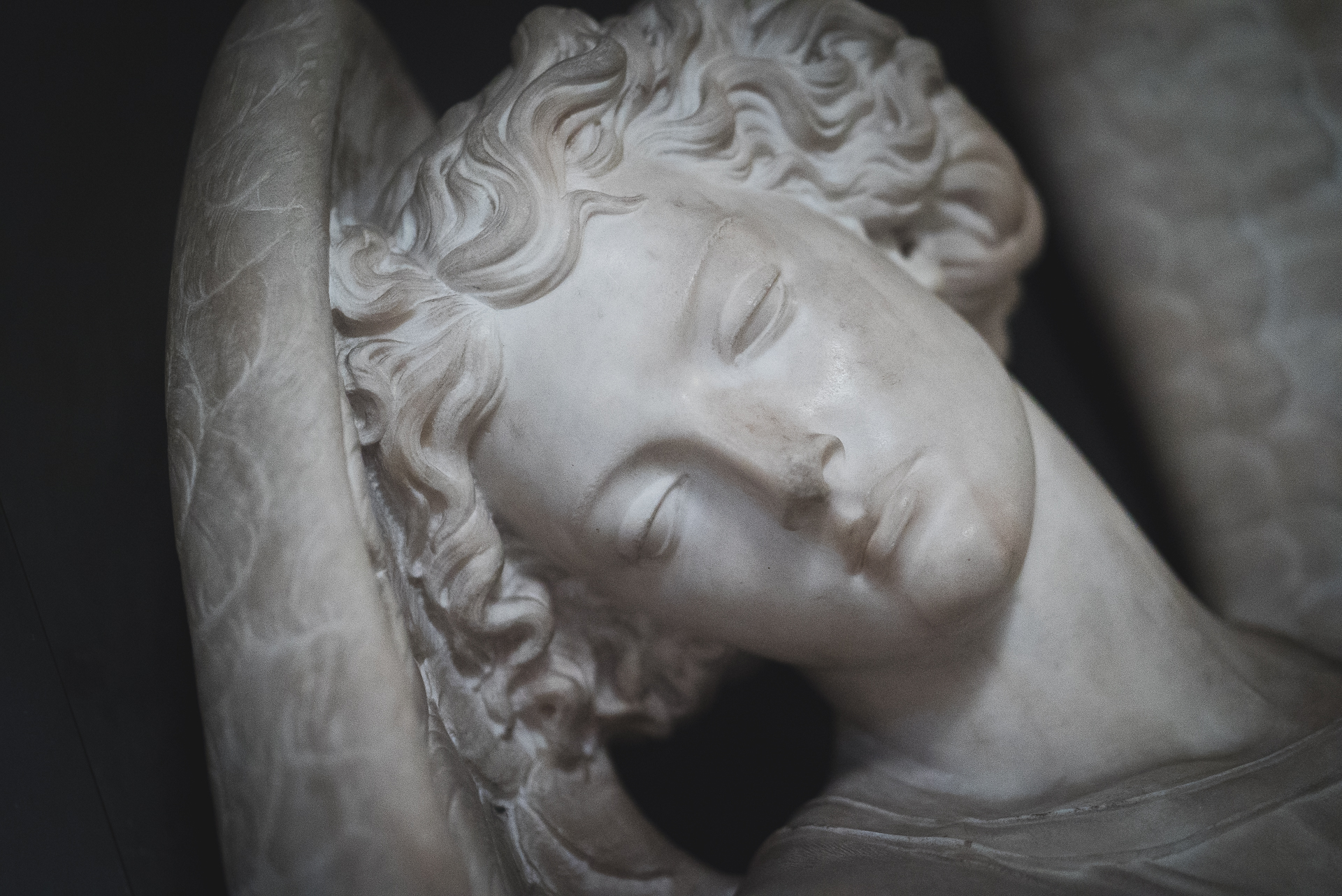
Memorial to Viscounts William and Frederick Melbourne, St Paul's Cathedral

From his studio and foundry Marochetti, and his workforce, produced numerous statues, memorials and equestrian monuments plus smaller pieces. He also experimented with the use of new materials and the creation of multi-coloured, or polychromic, sculptures. Between 1853 and 1855 Marochetti created three life-size statues, plus busts and garden ornaments, for the Kingston Lacy country mansion in Dorset. His equestrian statues included those of Viscount Combermere in Chester and Sir Mark Cubbon in Bangalore and for Queen Victoria and Prince Albert in Glasgow. Works featuring mourning angels by Marochetti include the monument in St. Paul's Cathedral to Viscounts William and Frederick Melbourne, the Crimean War memorial at the Haydarpaşa Cemetery in Istanbul, dating from 1856 to 1858, and his Angel of the Resurrection for the Cawnpore memorial in India from 1862 to 1865. From 1864 Marochetti collaborated with Sir Edwin Landseer on the four bronze lions to be placed at the base of Nelson's Column in Trafalgar Square, and cast them at his Sydney Mews foundry. He experimented in using coloured marble following the work of John Gibson and a coloured statuette of Queen Victoria was exhibited at a London studio but is now lost.

Not all of Marochetti's designs were so successful. His proposed design for the tomb of the Duke of Wellington was rejected. Marochetti's equestrian monument to George Washington for the 1853 World Fair in New York was destroyed by fire. In the 1860s he championed a scheme for a set of statues celebrating British engineers to be erected in the churchyard of St Margaret's, Westminster. The scheme was rejected but three of the statues, of Isambard Kingdom Brunel, Robert Stephenson and Joseph Locke were erected separately elsewhere. His monumental statue of Robert Peel in Parliament Square was melted down and the metal used for the smaller model of Peel by Matthew Noble which replaced it.

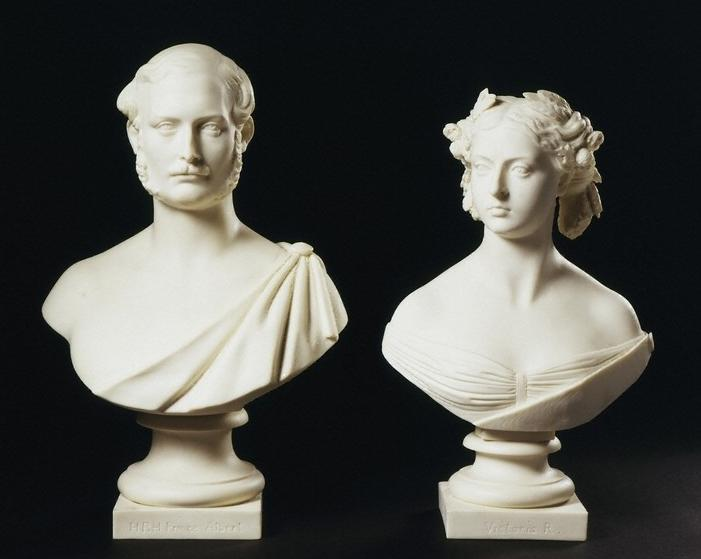
Busts of Queen Victoria and Prince Albert

With the support of the exiled Louis-Philippe of France, Marochetti first met Queen Victoria and Prince Albert in 1849 and subsequently received a number of royal commissions. Marochetti's first royal commission in England was for a marble portrait bust of Prince Albert in 1849, which was commercially reproduced in Parian ware by the Mintons company in 1862. That year Queen Victoria commissioned Marochetti to produce a portrait bust of herself as a birthday gift for Prince Albert and that too was reproduced by Mintons for the retail market. Rather than a crown, he depicted her wearing a headpiece of various flowers, including roses and shamrocks, to represent the nations of the United Kingdom.

Marochetti designed Victoria's memorial to Princess Elizabeth and a bust of Prince Albert at Newport Minster on the Isle of Wight. He also created the marble recumbent effigies for the tomb of Queen Victoria and Prince Albert in the Royal Mausoleum at Frogmore in Windsor Great Park. He was commissioned to make the seated figure of Albert for the Albert Memorial in Kensington Gardens. However the first version was rejected by the architect of the monument, Sir George Gilbert Scott, and Marochetti died before a satisfactory second version could be completed. He was elected an associate of the Royal Academy 1861 and a full academician in 1866.

Marochetti died, suddenly, at Passy in Paris and was buried at the Vaux-sur-Seine cemetery.

== Selected public works ==
=== 1830-1839 ===
Image	Title / subject	Location and coordinates	Date	Type	Material	Dimensions	Designation	Wikidata	Notes
More images	Tommaso grave	Père-Lachaise cemetery, Paris		Sculpture on pillar	Stone			Q112342353	
More images	Battle of Jemappes	East facade of the Arc de Triomphe, Paris	1834	Relief panel	Stone	18m x 3.5m			
More images	Grave of Vincenzo Bellini	Père-Lachaise cemetery, Paris	After 1835	Obelisk with portrait medallion	Stone			Q112308945	Architect: Guillaume-Abel Blouet
More images	Marochetti tomb	Père-Lachaise cemetery, Paris	1838	Pillar with reliefs	Stone			Q112332551	
More images	Statue of Emmanuel Philibert, Duke of Savoy	Piazza San Carlo, Turin	1838	Equestrian statue on pedestal with relief panels	Bronze and stone			Q3663864	

=== 1840-1849 ===
Image	Title / subject	Location and coordinates	Date	Type	Material	Dimensions	Designation	Wikidata	Notes
More images	Théophile Corret de la Tour d'Auvergne	Carhaix-Plouguer, Brittany, France	c. 1840	Statue on pedestal with relief panels	Bronze and stone			Q108628354	
More images	Mary Magdalen Exalted by Angels	La Madeleine, Paris	c.1842	Sculpture group and altar	Marble				
More images	Claude Louis Berthollet	Jardins de I'Europe, Annecy, France	1843	Statue on pedestal	Bronze and stone			Q56716583	
More images	Statue of Arthur Wellesley, 1st Duke of Wellington	Royal Exchange Square, Glasgow	1844	Equestrian statue on pedestal with relief panels	Bronze and granite		Category A	Q7981506	
More images	Ferdinand Philippe, Duke of Orléans	Eu, Seine-Maritime, France	1845	Equestrian statue on pedestal with relief panels	Bronze & stone			Q20799860	
More images	Ferdinand Philippe, Duke of Orléans	Neuilly-sur-Seine, France	1845	Equestrian statue on pedestal with relief panels	Bronze & stone			Q96600378	Monument was originally erected in Algiers, relocated 1980
More images	Pierre Paul Royer-Collard	Vitry-Le-Francois, Marne, France	1846	Statue on pedestal	Bronze & stone				

=== 1850-1859 ===
Image	Title / subject	Location and coordinates	Date	Type	Material	Dimensions	Designation	Wikidata	Notes
	Memorial to Granville Gower Loch	St Paul's Cathedral, London	1853	Relief plaque	Marble				
	Tomb of the Contesse de Lariboisiere	Chapel of Lariboisière Hospital, Paris	1853	Statues and sculpture group on pedestal	Marble				
	George Washington	Exhibition of the Industry of All Nations, New York City	1853	Equestrian statue	Bronze				Original was destroyed by fire, but a small version was erected at Vaux-sur-Seine and later moved to Chateau de Cheverny
More images	Queen Victoria	George Square, Glasgow	1854	Equestrian statue on pedestal with relief panels	Bronze and granite		Category A	Q17567473	First equestrian statue of a woman in Britain.
More images	Arthur Wellesley, 1st Duke of Wellington	Woodhouse Moor, Leeds	1854, erected 1858	Statue on pedestal	Bronze and granite		Grade II	Q26656015	
	Sir John Bankes	Kingston Lacy, Dorset	1853-55	Bust	Bronze				One of two busts, plus a life-size statue, of Bankes which Marochetti created for Kingston Lacey
	King Charles I	Kingston Lacy, Dorset	1853-55	Statue on stand	Bronze				
	Mary Bankes 1598-1661	Kingston Lacy, Dorset	1853-55	Statue on stand	Bronze				
More images	Memorial to Viscounts William and Frederick Melbourne	St. Paul's Cathedral, London	After 1853	False door flanked by two statues	White & black marble and gilded bronze				
More images	James Oswald	George Square, Glasgow	1855	Statue on pedestal	Bronze and granite		Category B	Q17792900	
More images	Statue of Richard Coeur de Lion	Palace of Westminster, London	1856	Equestrian statue on pedestal	Bronze and granite		Grade II	Q7324819	
More images	Memorial to John Cust, 1st Earl Brownlow	Church of St Peter and St Paul, Belton, South Kesteven	1856	Effigy on chest tomb	Marble		Grade I		
	The Scutari Obelisk, Crimean War memorial	Haydarpaşa Cemetery, Istanbul	1856-58	Obelisk with supporting statues on pedestal	Stone				

=== 1860 and later ===
Image	Title / subject	Location and coordinates	Date	Type	Material	Dimensions	Designation	Wikidata	Notes
More images	Clive of India	The Square, Shrewsbury	c. 1860	Statue on pedestal	Bronze and granite		Grade II	Q26546539	
More images	9th Queens Royal Lancers memorial	Exeter Cathedral	1860	Relief panels	Marble and bronze		Grade I	Q83187729	
More images	Cavalry Division Crimean War memorial	St Paul's Cathedral, London	1860-65	Tripartite curved relief plaque	Marble				
More images	Major General Sir Arthur Wellesley Torrens	St Paul's Cathedral, London	1860-65	Relief plaque	Marble				
More images	Coldstream Guards Battle of Inkerman memorial	St Paul's Cathedral, London	1860-1865	Deep relief plaque	Stone				
More images	Charles Albert of Sardinia	Piazza Carlo Alberto, Turin	1861	Equestrian statue on pedestal with statues at base	Bronze and stone			Q21141719	
More images	Angel of the Resurrection, Siege of Cawnpore memorial	Cawnpore, India	1862-65	Statue with cross on pedestal with surrounding walls	Stone				Architect, Henry Yule.
More images	Sidney Herbert, 1st Baron Herbert of Lea	Victoria Park, Salisbury	1863	Statue on pedestal	Bronze and stone		Grade II	Q26536005	
More images	Gioachino Rossini	Conservatorio Statale di Musica "Gioachino Rossini", Pesaro, Italy	1864	Seated statue on pedestal	Bronze & stone			Q121093784	Plaster model in the Victoria and Albert Museum
More images	Anthony Panizzi	British Library, London	1864	Bust	Carrara marble	71cm x 50cm			
More images	George Cornewall Lewis	St Peter's Square, Hereford	c. 1864	Statue on pedestal	Bronze and granite		Grade II	Q47472418	
More images	Queen Victoria and Albert, Prince Consort	Royal Mausoleum, Frogmore	1864-68	Two recumbent tomb effigies	Marble		Grade I		Marochetti also created the four bronze figures of angels kneeling at each corner of the tomb
More images	Statue of Viscount Combermere	Grosvenor Road, Chester	1865	Equestrian statue on pedestal	Bronze and granite	7.1m tall	Grade II*	Q15978984	
	Albert, Prince Consort	Union Terrace, Aberdeen	1865	Statue on pedestal	Bronze and granite		Category B	Q17770085	
More images	William Makepeace Thackeray	Poets' Corner, Westminster Abbey, London	1865	Bust	Marble				
More images	Albert, Prince Consort	George Square, Glasgow	1866	Equestrian statue on pedestal	Bronze and granite		Category A	Q17567468	
	Statue of Arthur Wellesley, 1st Duke of Wellington	The Wellington Monument, Stratfield Saye House, Hampshire	1866	Statue on column	Bronze		Grade II	Q26384539	
	Statue of Mark Cubbon	Cubbon Park, Bangalore	1866	Equestrian statue on pedestal	Bronze and stone			Q97183425	
	Joseph Locke	Locke Park, Barnsley	1866	Statue on pedestal with balustrade	Bronze, granite and Portland stone		Grade II	Q26443938	
More images	Colin Campbell, 1st Baron Clyde	Waterloo Place, London	1867	Statue on piller with statues at base	Bronze and red granite		Grade II	Q27083599	
More images	Statue of Robert Stephenson	Euston station, London	Erected 1870	Statue on pedestal	Bronze and granite	2.7m tall	Grade II	Q27084501	
More images	Statue of Isambard Kingdom Brunel	Victoria Embankment, London	c.1877	Statue on pedestal with surrounding screen	Bronze and Portland stone	2.5m tall	Grade II	Q20829598	Pedestal by Richard Norman Shaw.
More images	Jonas Webb	High Street, Babraham, Cambridgeshire	Late 19th century	Statue on pedestal	Bronze and stone		Grade II	Q26616046	

=== Other works ===
- Seated statue in marble of Sir Jamsetjee Jeejeebhoy, 1857, in the Asiatic Society Library, Mumbai Town Hall. Two versions in bronze of the same design, at the entrance to the JJ Institute and on Narriman Road, are also known.
- Memorial, in marble and black stone, to Sixteen Officers of the Engineers of 1857-58, c. 1862, in St. Paul's Cathedral, Kolkata. The memorial has a central inscription listing the names of British officers killed in the Indian Rebellion of 1857 with a surround containing their portraits in carved relief above a panel depicting the Siege of Lucknow.
- Bust of Queen Victoria, Haddo House, Scotland
- East Devonshire Regiment Crimean War memorial, Exeter Cathedral
- Memorial plaque, with portrait medallion, to Prince Albert, Sts Thomas Minster, Newport, Isle of Wight
- Monument to Princess Elizabeth, 1635–1650, Sts Thomas Minster, Newport, Isle of Wight, 1856
- Tomb of Lady Margaret Leveson Gower, Church of St Mary Magdalene, Castle Ashby, Northamptonshire, c. 1858
- Statue of St Michael, Parish Church of Champmotteux, Essonne
- Statue of General Henri Gatien Bertrand, 1773–1844, at Châteauroux, Indre, France
- Bronze bust of John Charles Robinson from 1864-65 in the Victoria and Albert Museum, London
- Plaster head of George Washington, from 1851-53, in the Victoria and Albert Museum collection
