= Hemery =

Hemery may refer to:

- Hemery (surname)
- Vingtaine de la Ville, Hemery Row, Jersey
- Le Pont Hemery, near 35370 Le Pertre, east of Rennes, Bretagne, France
- Pont-Hemery, SE of the city of Dijon, Bourgogne, France
