= Richard Coeur de Lion (disambiguation) =

Richard Coeur de Lion is an epithet of Richard I, King of England from 1189 to 1199.

Richard Coeur de Lion may also refer to:

- Richard Coeur-de-lion (opera), a French-language opéra comique by André Grétry first performed in 1784
- Richard Coeur de Lion (play), a 1786 English-language semi-opera by John Burgoyne and Thomas Linley the Elder
- Richard Coeur de Lion (statue), an equestrian statue of Richard I in London, England
- Richard Coer de Lyon, a 14th-century Middle English romance

== See also ==
- Coeur de Lion (disambiguation)
