= Richard Coeur de Lion (statue) =

Sculpture by Carlo Marochetti

Coordinates: 51.499157°N 0.125584°W

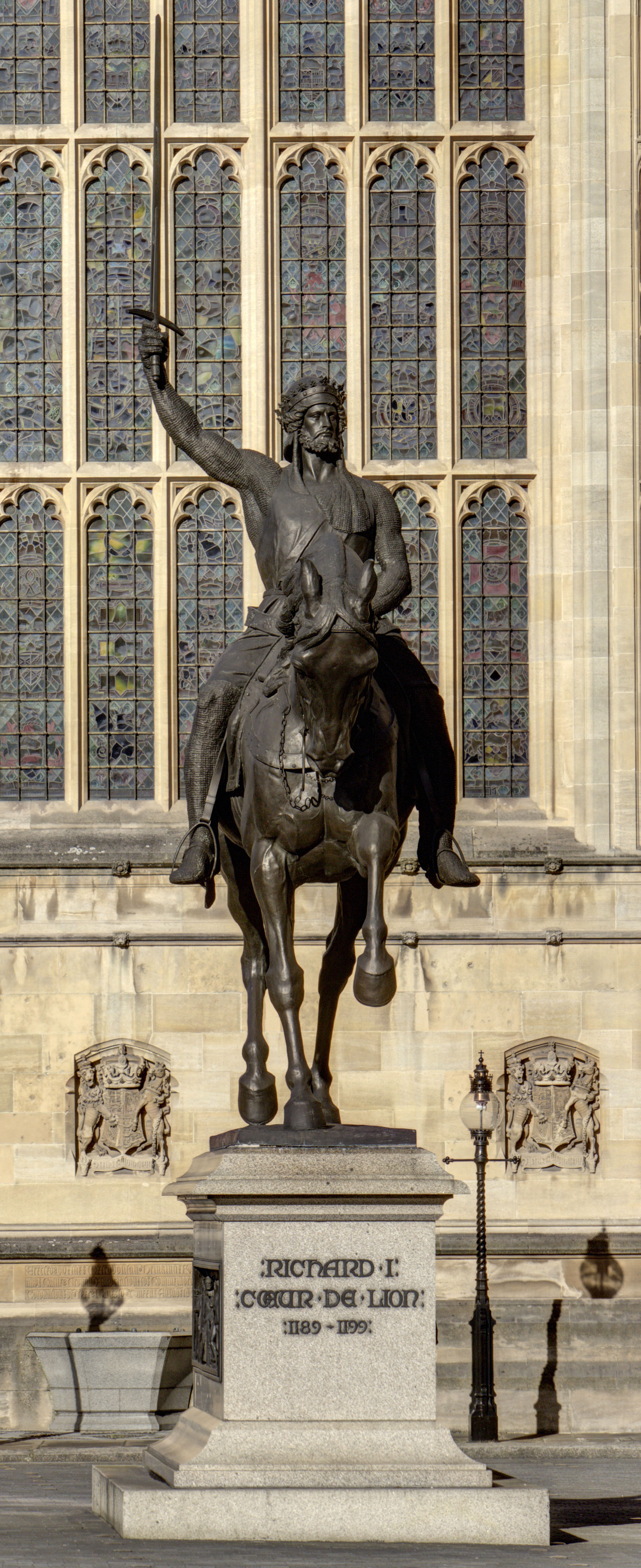
- The sculpture in 2015
- Artist: Carlo Marochetti
- Year: 1851 (clay model); 1854 (plaster model); 1856 (bronze)
- Type: Equestrian statue
- Dimensions: 9 m (30 ft)
- Location: London, SW1 United Kingdom

Richard Coeur de Lion is a Grade II listed equestrian statue of the 12th-century English monarch Richard I, also known as Richard the Lionheart, who reigned from 1189 to 1199. It stands on a granite pedestal in Old Palace Yard outside the Palace of Westminster in London, facing south towards the entrance to the House of Lords. It was created by Baron Carlo Marochetti, an Italian sculptor whose works were popular with European royalty and the nobility, though often less well regarded by critics and the artistic establishment. The statue was first produced in clay and displayed at The Great Exhibition in 1851, where it was located outside the west entrance to the Crystal Palace. It was well received at the time and two years later Queen Victoria and Prince Albert headed a list of illustrious subscribers to a fund that aimed to raise money for the casting of the statue in bronze.

Although the money was duly raised and the bronze cast of the statue was finally completed in 1856, a lengthy dispute delayed its installation for several years. The original idea had been to erect the statue as a memorial to the Great Exhibition. This prompted opposition, as did proposals to place it outside Charles Barry's newly completed Palace of Westminster. Various other locations to display the statue were initially considered before agreement was reached that it would be placed in Old Palace Yard, Marochetti's preferred location. It was installed in October 1860, though it was not until March 1867 that it was finally completed with the addition of bronze bas-reliefs on either side of the pedestal.

The quality of the statue's workmanship caused problems during its first half-century; the horse's tail fell off the day after it was installed at the Great Exhibition, and forty years after its installation it was discovered to be riddled with holes and to have never been properly attached to its pedestal. It narrowly escaped destruction during the Second World War when a German bomb dropped during the Blitz landed a few metres away and peppered it with shrapnel. The pedestal and the horse's tail were damaged and Richard's sword was bent by the blast. In 2009, the Parliamentary authorities undertook a project to conserve and restore the statue.

== Description ==
The statue was created by Baron Carlo Marochetti and is located in Old Palace Yard outside the Palace of Westminster, opposite Westminster Abbey in London. With its pedestal, it stands 9 metres (30 ft) high, showing King Richard I on horseback. The king is depicted wearing a crowned helmet and a chainmail shirt with a surcoat, and lifting a sword into the air. The horse paws the ground, as if preparing for a charge into battle. Marochetti described his work as being inspired by Richard I rather than accurately depicting a 12th-century knight.

It stands on a granite pedestal also designed by Marochetti and made by Freeman & Co. of Penryn, Cornwall. Bas-relief panels showing Crusaders fighting the Saracens at the Battle of Ascalon and Richard on his deathbed pardoning Bertran de Gourdon, the archer who fatally shot him in 1199, were added to the east and west sides of the pedestal in 1866–67. As the statue cannot be accessed by the general public – the area around it is used as the House of Lords car park – the west-side scene showing Richard and Bertran is the only one visible from the street. According to Marochetti, the two bas-reliefs were designed in the style of Lorenzo Ghiberti's doors at the Florence Baptistry. Bronze letters on the front of the pedestal bear the inscription RICHARD I CŒUR DE LION / 1189–1199.

The great majority of the art in and around the Houses of Parliament is of British origin, due to a policy of acquiring British art for the building. Marochetti's statue thus represents one of the few examples of a non-British artist's work being selected for the Parliamentary estate.

== History ==
=== Creation and display at the Great Exhibition ===
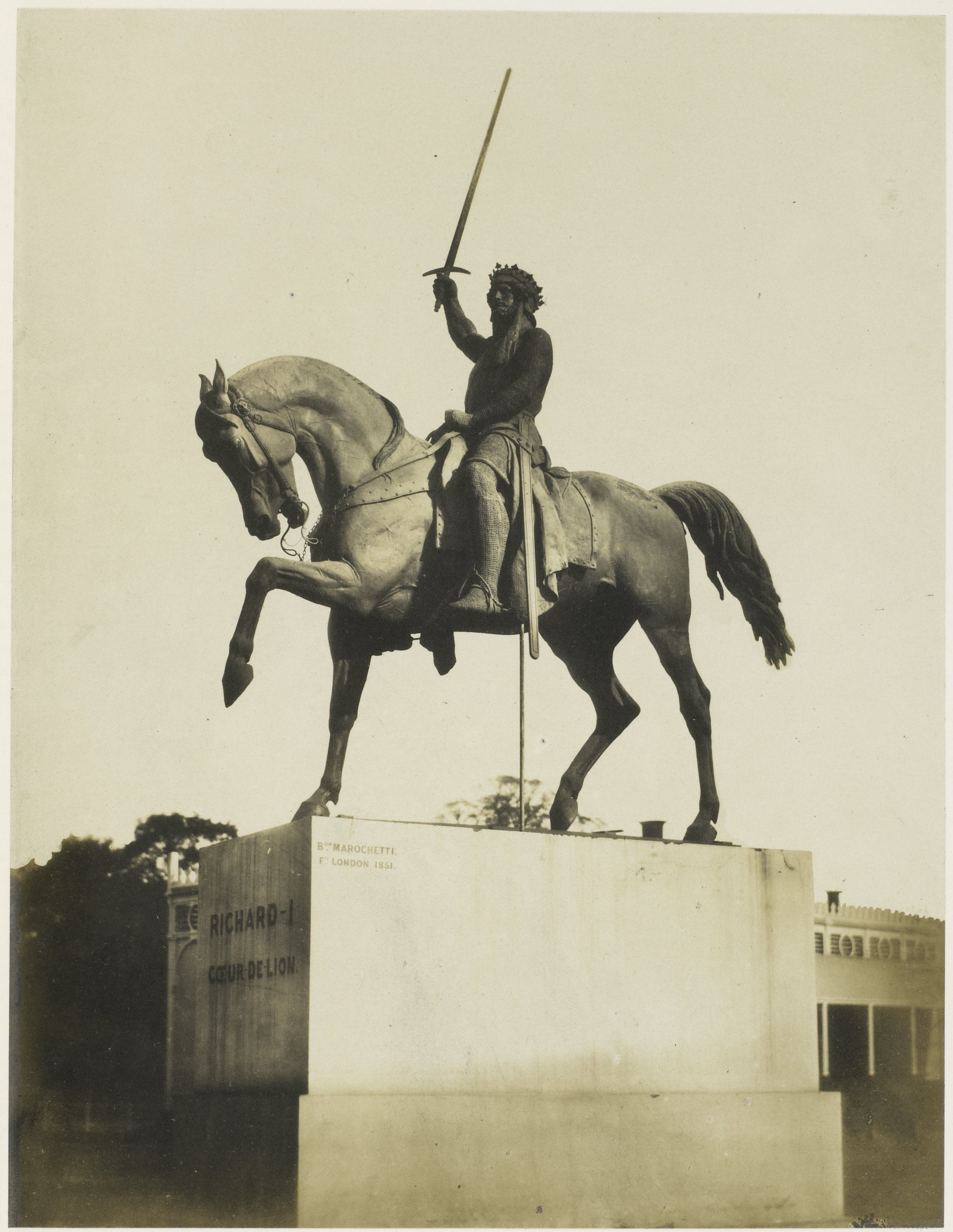
The original clay statue on display in Hyde Park during the Great Exhibition of 1851

Marochetti was born in Italy and was ennobled by the Kingdom of Sardinia but lived and worked in France, creating a number of prestigious works for the royalist French government in the 1830s. He made his name by creating equestrian statues; one, of the Duke of Wellington, was erected in Glasgow in 1840. By the 1840s, however, his popularity in continental Europe was in decline. The French Revolution of 1848, which saw the final overthrow of the French monarchy, prompted him to resettle in London and seek new patrons among the British elite.

Marochetti was not popular with the Victorian artistic establishment; Punch referred to him derisively as "Count Marrowfatty", while John Timbs wrote that he "owed more of his success in life to royal and noble patrons than artistic merit." It was certainly true that he benefited from the patronage of Queen Victoria and Prince Albert. His courtly manners impressed Victoria on their first meeting in 1849, and soon afterwards he became involved with the Prince Consort's plans for what became the Great Exhibition of 1851. Several countries planned to display sculptures of romantic historical figures in their contributions to the exhibition. The genre was common in mainland Europe but relatively rare in England at the time. Marochetti was probably aware that the Belgian sculptor Eugène Simonis intended to show his statue of Godfrey of Bouillon, the leader of the First Crusade, which King Leopold I of Belgium had commissioned. The two men had a number of connections; they shared the same bronze founder, Soyer of Paris, and Simonis was influenced by Marochetti's earlier acclaimed statue of the Duke of Savoy, Emanuele Filiberto. The Italian sculptor was probably motivated by a sense of competition with the Belgian in designing his Richard I.

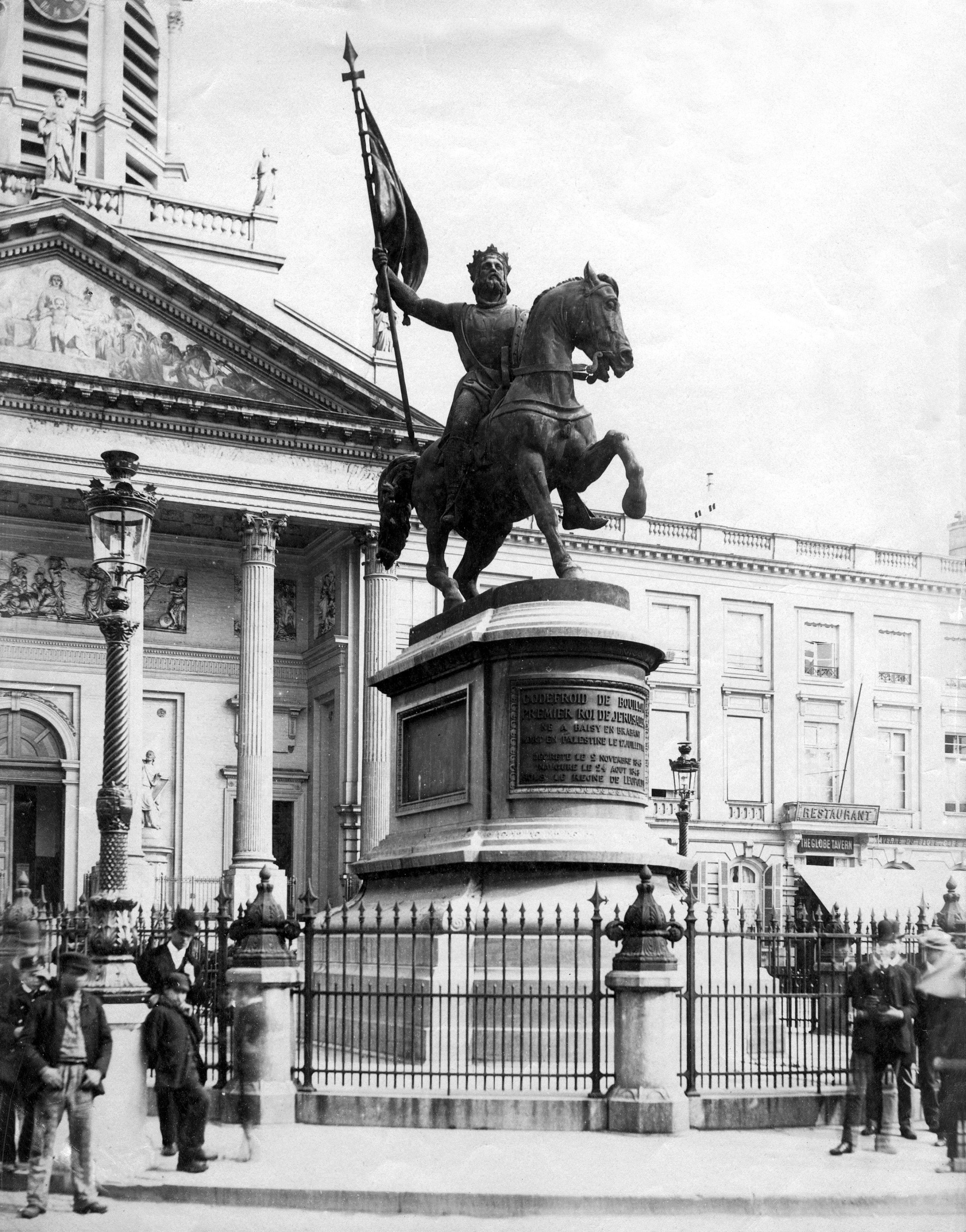
Eugène Simonis's statue of Godfrey of Bouillon in Brussels, also displayed at the Great Exhibition

Marochetti's creation of the clay model of the statue involved not only the sculptor himself but also the painter Victor Mottez, King Louis Philippe's personal physician Henri Gueneau de Mussy and the singers Mario and Garcia, all of whom contributed manual input. A clay model of the statue was displayed as one of two statues positioned outside the western entrance of the Crystal Palace in Hyde Park. Unfortunately it was so poorly assembled that shortly after the opening of the exhibition on 1 May 1851, the horse's tail fell off. It was repaired and the statue eventually attracted critical acclaim. The art critic John Ruskin said of the model, "it will tend more to educate the public with respect to art than anything we have done for centuries". It came to be regarded as one of the more popular items in the exhibition and Prince Albert personally took King Leopold to see it and the statue by Simonis, which now stands in the Grand-Place of Brussels. The Art Journal was later to describe it as "unquestionably a vigorous and spirited example of the bravura class of sculpture."

=== Casting and dispute over location ===
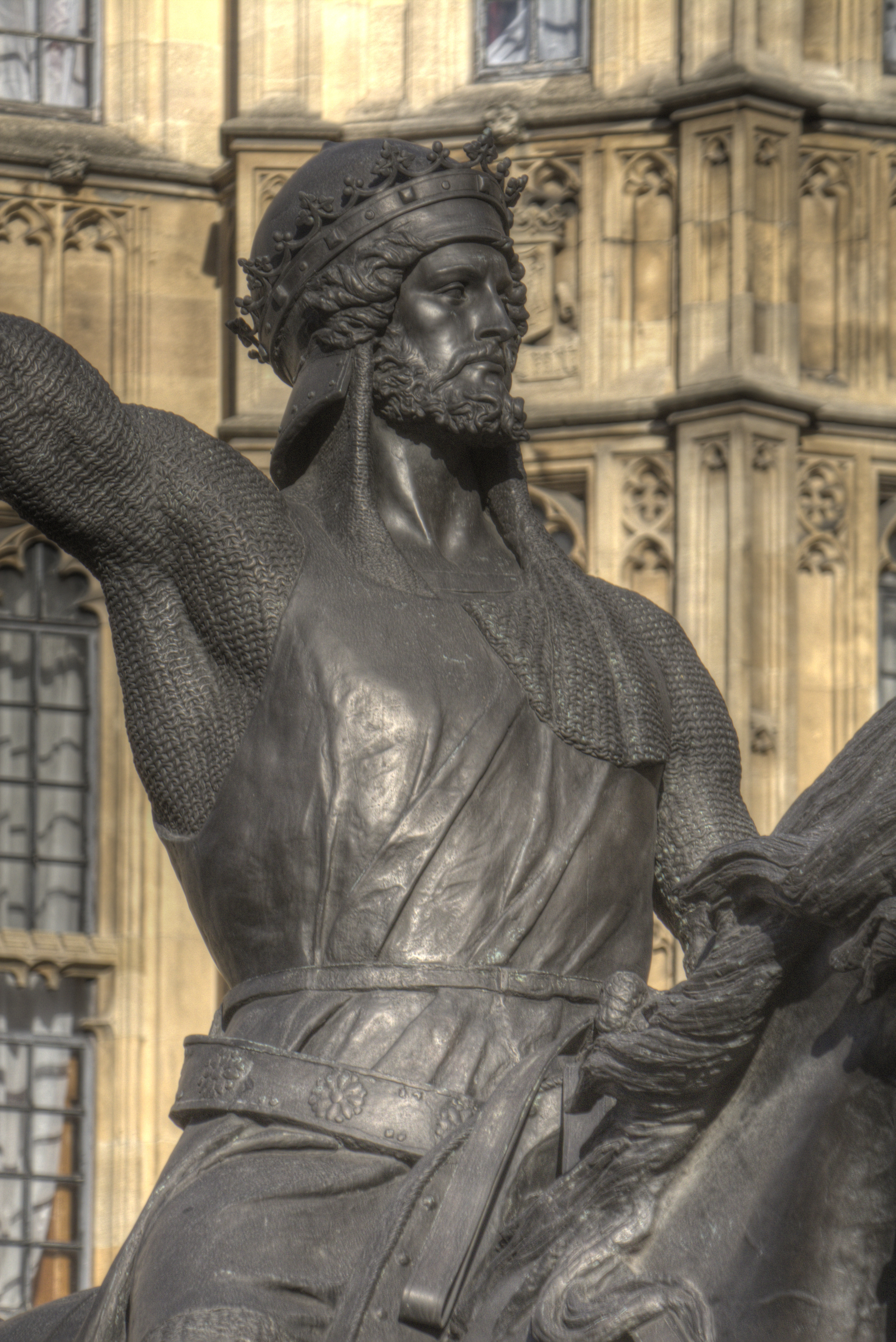
Close-up view of the statue's upper body; the close fitting of Richard's chainmail shirt was criticised as being unrealistic

Major General Charles Richard Fox proposed during the exhibition that a bronze cast should be made of the statue to serve as a memorial to the exhibition, marking one end of the site of the Crystal Palace with a statue of Prince Albert at the other end. A campaign got underway two years later, in May 1853, with a variety of the great and the good signing a brochure promoting a scheme to erect the statue somewhere in London. Its supporters included the Duke of Sutherland, Lord Lansdowne, the Earl of Shaftesbury, the sculptor John Henry Foley, the novelist William Makepeace Thackeray, the ceramic manufacturer William Taylor Copeland and the Conservative MP (and future Prime Minister) Benjamin Disraeli. The Times was strongly in favour of the project due to the influence of its foreign affairs reporter Henry Reeve, who had known Marochetti since as early as 1839. The Royal Family also let it be known that they were supporters, with Queen Victoria donating £200 and Prince Albert £100.

The future location of the statue was a contentious issue from the outset, with Fox's proposal of a site in Hyde Park being sidelined in favour of leaving the site open for future consideration. The appropriateness of its theme in relation to the Great Exhibition was also questioned. The Art Journal pointed out the contradiction between "the effigy of a valiant crusader" and "the great Peace congress of 1851" and asked why "a foreign sculptor alone" was being selected to commemorate a British exhibition. The Lord Mayor of London, Thomas Challis, was similarly critical, declaring that the statue depicted "muscular power and the almost savage ferocity of war ..., while ... the Great Exhibition afforded an example of the cordial amity of nations." His criticism was perhaps not unrelated to the fact that he was promoting a rival scheme to commemorate the Exhibition. Others criticised the statue's lack of realism. As The Times observed after the statue's installation, the sculptor "sacrificed probabilities in the close fit he has given to Richard's mail shirt, which is made to display the swelling biceps and folded mass of pectoral muscle as accurately as a knitted woollen jersey."

Despite the criticism, £5,000 (equivalent to £549,000 today) was raised by private donations for a bronze version to be created. Parliament subsequently agreed to contribute £1,650 for the pedestal and a further £1,500 for two bas-reliefs to be installed on its sides. In 1854 a plaster version was placed in New Palace Yard facing west outside Westminster Hall, but Charles Barry, the architect of the palace, was opposed to its placement there. The Art Journal criticised the New Palace Yard location on the grounds that the statue was merely a novelty and, worse, depicted an unworthy subject – "a disobedient son and a bad governor". It also suffered from being lost against the architectural details of the Palace of Westminster. By early May 1854, the plaster statue had been removed.

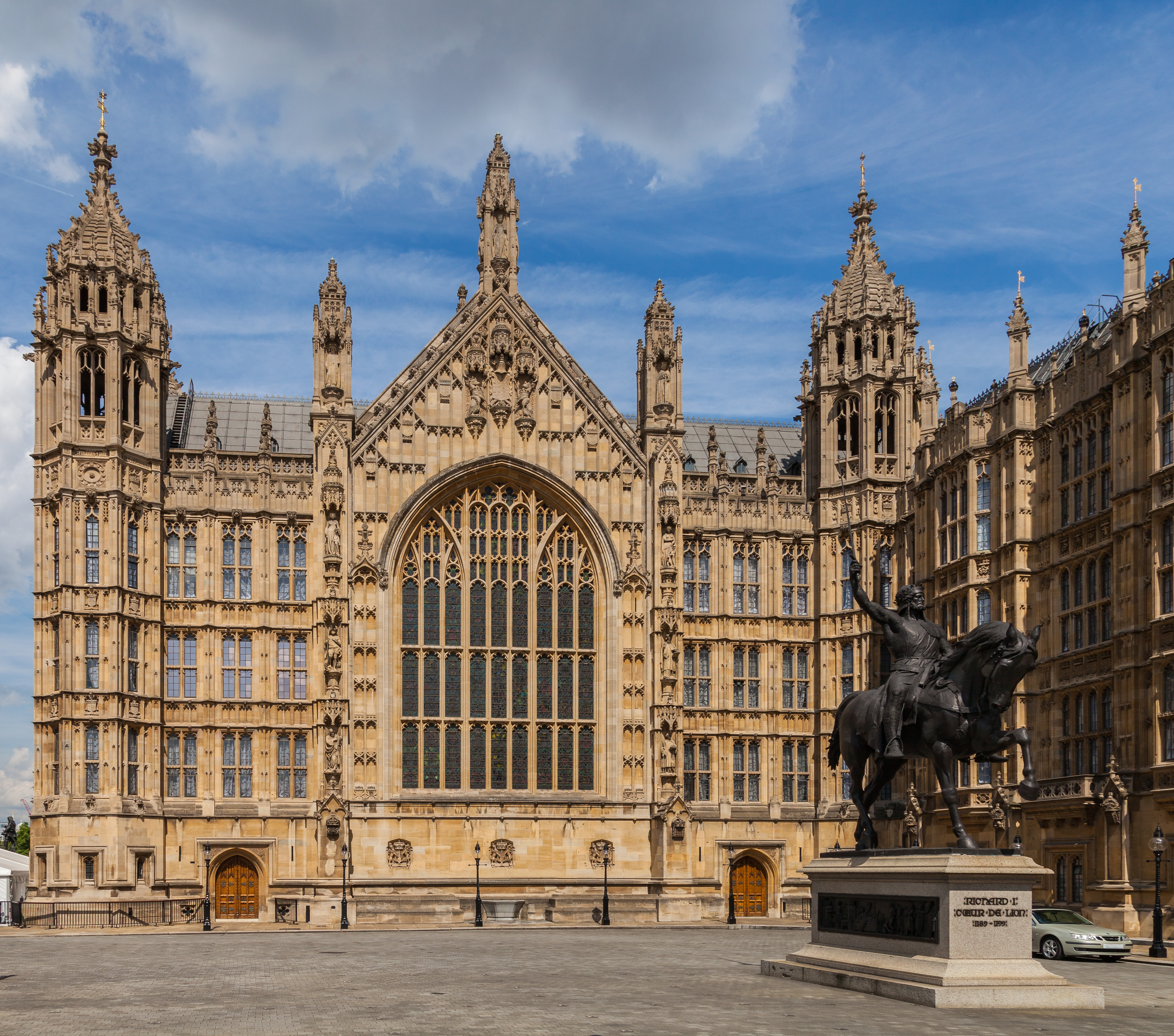
The sculpture in Old Palace Yard

In 1856, Marochetti had the statue cast in bronze at the workshop that he had established in the early 1850s in Sydney Mews, off Fulham Road. The casting and the statue's gifting to the nation in the summer of 1856 made the question of its location all the more essential to resolve. Other sites were considered, including outside Buckingham Palace, Carlton Gardens near the Horse Guards and even on top of Marble Arch. Prince Albert himself suggested locating it outside the west entrance of Westminster Abbey, looking down the newly created Victoria Street. Punch mocked the ongoing search for a location in an August 1857 issue, calling Richard I "the Wandering Statue of London". The anonymous writer asked whether "no-one [will] find standing-room for this fugitive king? Is there no spot, no royal mews, no academic stable where his over-driven steed can be taken in to bait?"

Marochetti proposed to install it in Old Palace Yard outside the south window of Westminster Hall. His idea was considered by the Fine Arts Commission for the Palace of Westminster and was deemed acceptable, although Sir Charles Barry again opposed it. His reasoning was that Old Palace Yard was "too limited in area, and too irregular and unsymmetrical in its form and approaches, to give due effect to it, as a work of art ..." For his part, Marochetti positively preferred the location's irregularity to the symmetry of a formally laid-out square. The dispute continued until 1859 when the Commissioner of Works, Lord John Manners, finally agreed to install the statue in Marochetti's favoured location. By this time Sir Charles Barry was seriously ill (and died on 12 May 1860) so was no longer in a position to offer opposition.

=== Installation and subsequent history ===
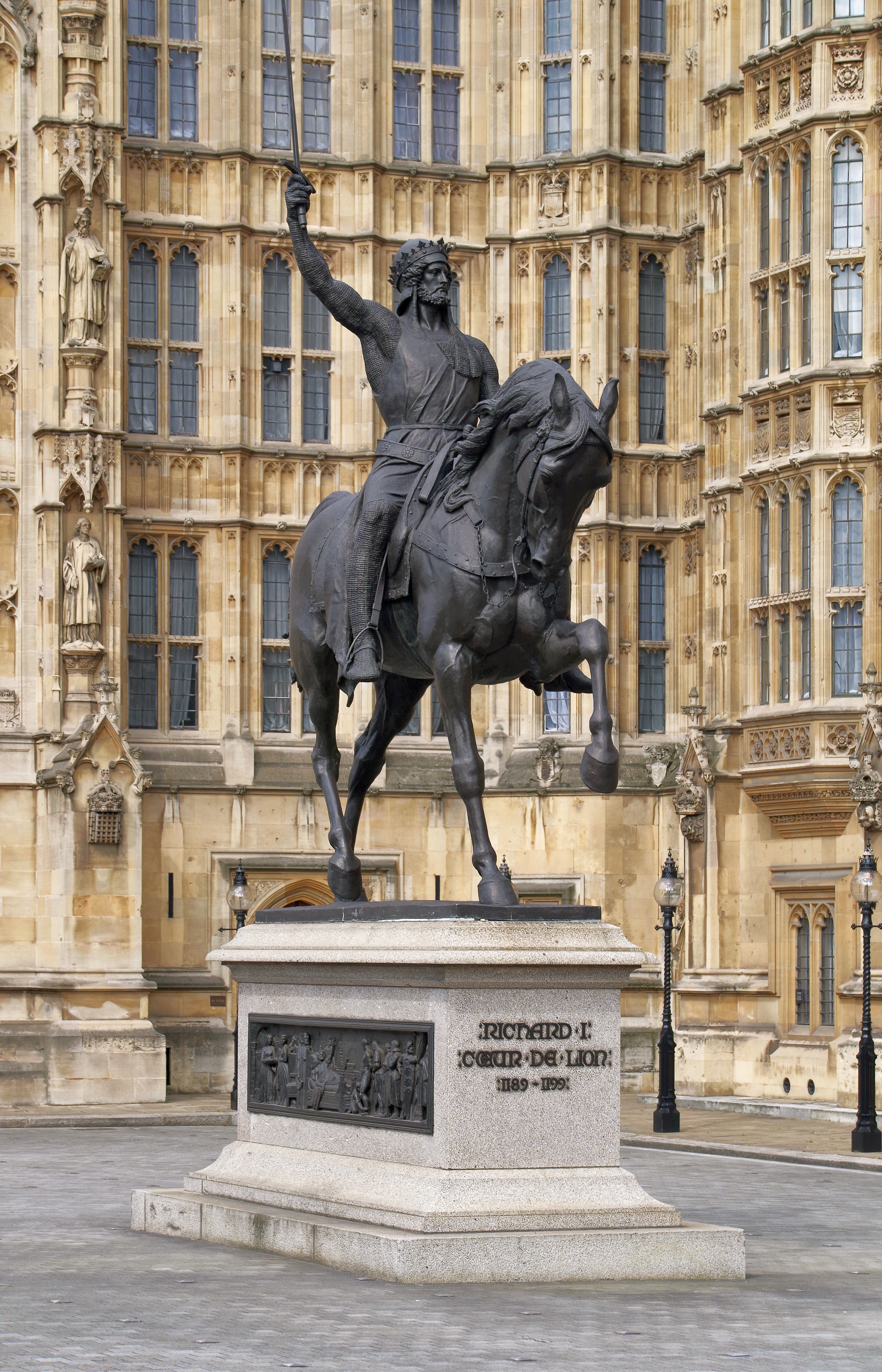
Side view of the statue in 2014 showing the bas-relief on the west side of the pedestal

Parliament voted to fund a pedestal for the statue, carved from Cornish granite, but transportation delays meant that it was not until 26 October 1860 that the statue was placed on its pedestal and unveiled to the public. It was completely undecorated at first but a bronze shield was placed on the front end of the pedestal shortly after the installation. The Times (probably its pro-Marochetti reporter Henry Reeve) declared that with the installation of the statue "a great reproach had been removed from London", which now finally had a great equestrian monument which displayed a "combination of life and picturesqueness". It claimed that Marochetti's Richard I ranked "with the few great statues of that class in Europe". Not all critics were as fulsome; the British critic and poet Francis Turner Palgrave castigated it as "an essentially vulgar and low-class work precisely on the grounds that call forth the wonder of uncultivated spectators." It was said to have been particularly appreciated by London's cabbies, who tethered their horses nearby.

Marochetti also intended to add bas-reliefs to either side of the pedestal and had provisioned it with "sunk panels" ready for the reliefs to be installed. He proposed to create four "alto relievos in the style of the Ghiberti doors on the Battisterio at Florence", depicting the coronation of Richard in Westminster Abbey, the taking of Ascalon, Richard as a prisoner of the Saracens and Richard on his deathbed. He quoted £2,500 for all four, but Parliament voted instead to grant him £1,500 for two scenes – Ascalon and the death of Richard.

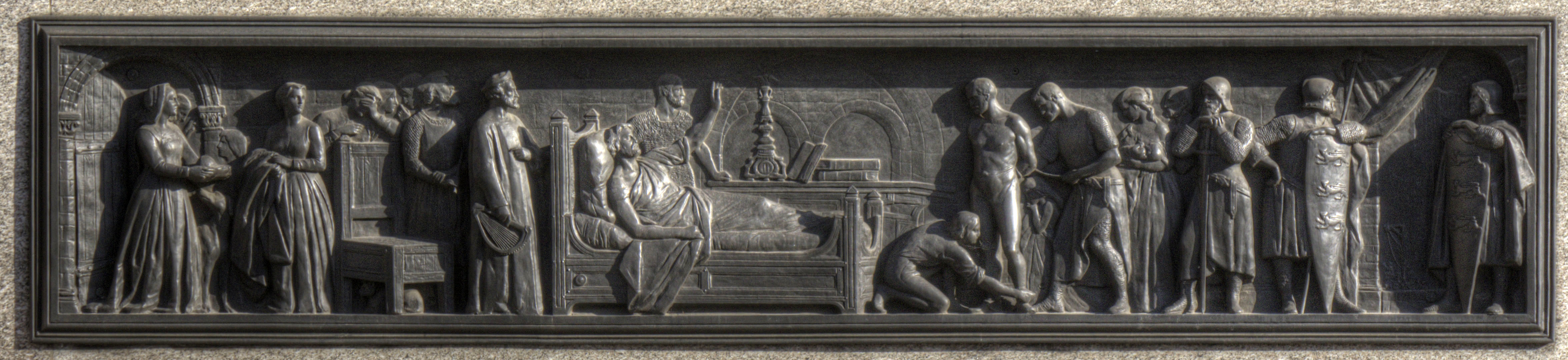
Detail of the bas-relief panel on the west side of the pedestal, depicting Richard on his deathbed pardoning the archer Bertrand de Gourdon

Marochetti accepted the commission and created plaster models of the reliefs. He installed one of the models in his château in France, where it remains today, while the other was set into the wall of a gardener's cottage adjoining his French estate. The bronze relief of the deathbed scene was added to the pedestal in August 1866, while the Taking of Ascalon was installed in March 1867. The Art Journal criticised the deathbed scene as being excessively stretched lengthways and noted similarities with a painting displayed in the Houses of Parliament, created by John Cross, that depicted the same subject.

Marochetti also pursued an abortive project to install a second giant equestrian statue in Old Palace Yard, this time portraying Edward, the Black Prince. He envisaged the two statues facing each other on either side of the entrance to the House of Lords. Although the scheme was reported in several journals, including the Illustrated London News, the Art Journal and the Athenaeum, and was strongly criticised for its perceived thematic inappropriateness, nothing came of it. Three different versions of the model for Marochetti's Black Prince came to light at the turn of the 21st century. They appear to have been designed at the same time as his Richard I, demonstrating their common origins; models of the two statues almost certainly would have co-existed in his workshop and Marochetti probably intended to seek a commission from Prince Albert. However, the death of the Prince Consort in 1861 deprived him of his most influential patron, and Marochetti's own death was to follow in 1867. Queen Victoria purchased one of Marochetti's statuette versions of the Black Prince following the sculptor's death and gave it to her son Edward, Prince of Wales. It is still part of the Royal Collection.

The statue has required repair work on several occasions to fix damage and defects. Only a few months after it was installed, it was reported to be oscillating in strong gusts of wind. Marochetti pronounced it sound but promised to strengthen the legs if necessary. During the winter of 1908–09, frost damaged one of the forelegs of the horse part of the statue. It was found that between 60 and 80 leaks were letting water into the interior of the statue and causing further damage when it froze. It was also discovered that the statue had never been properly attached to the pedestal but was merely resting under its own weight on the two ends of its base. Repair work took place to remedy these problems.

The statue was damaged during the Second World War when a large German bomb hit Old Palace Yard on 26 September 1940, during the Blitz. The bomb exploded only a few metres away from the statue and reportedly lifted it bodily off the ground. The upper part of the sword was bent and the tail of the horse suffered several holes from pieces of shrapnel. Vincent Massey, the High Commissioner for Canada, argued that the sword should be left unrepaired, as it symbolised "the strength of democracy which will bend but not break under attack." The sword was replaced in 1947, and other repair work was also done. However, damage to the pedestal can still be seen. The statue received Grade II listed status in February 1970.

In the summer of 2009, the Parliamentary authorities undertook a three-week conservation project to repair and restore the statue. It consisted of removing accumulated dirt and an old coating of black wax, repatinating the bronze surface to return it to its original colour and treating it with a clear wax as protection from pollution and the elements. The bas reliefs on the pedestal were also cleaned and treated, as was the pedestal itself.

== See also ==
- Anglia knight
