= Coeur de Lion =

Coeur de Lion (French for Lionheart) is a title used to describe several medieval monarchs:

- Richard I of England
- Louis VIII of France
- Boleslaus I of Poland

== Railway Locomotives ==
- Coeur de Lion, a Great Western Railway 4-4-0 broad gauge steam locomotive
- Coeur de Lion, the British Railways Standard 'Britannia' class locomotive number 70007 (the first of the class to be withdrawn)
- Coeur de Lion, the British Rail Class 87 locomotive number 87012

== Other uses ==
- Cœur de Lion, a French cheese brand by Bongrain
- Coeur de lion (film), original French title of 2008 film released in English as Heart of the Lion

== See also ==
- Coeur (disambiguation)
- Coeur d'Alene, Idaho, a city in northern Idaho, United States
- Lionheart (disambiguation)
