= Thérèse Eléonore Lingée =

French engraver (1753–1833)

- Born: Thérèse-Éléonore Hémery c. 1750; Paris, France
- Died: January 22, 1818; Paris, France
- Other names: Eléonore Lingée, Mlle Lingée, Eléonore Lefèvre
- Occupations: Engraver, designer
- Spouse(s): Charles Louis Lingée, J. F. Lefèvre

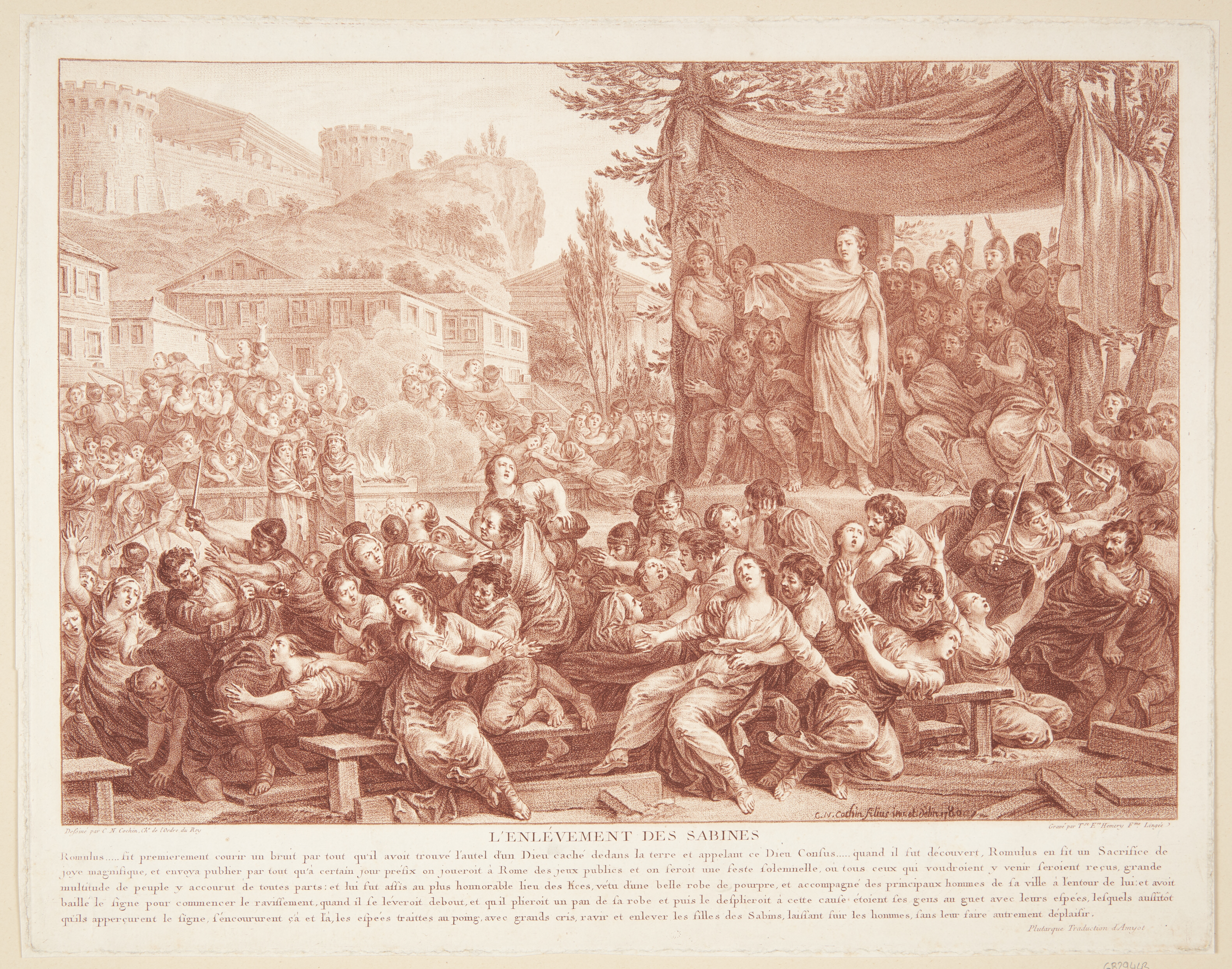
The Rape of the Sabine Women (c. 1780) stipple engraving by Thérèse Éléonore Lingée, after Charles-Nicolas Cochin (1715–1790)

Thérèse Eléonore Lingée (née Thérèse-Éléonore Hémery; c. 1750–January 22, 1818) was a French engraver, known for her crayon manner stipple engravings. She engraved religious subjects, genre scenes and portraits. She was from a French family of engravers.

== Life and career ==
Thérèse Eléonore Lingée was born as Thérèse-Éléonore Hémery in c. 1750, in Paris. She was from a family of noted engravers. Her older sister was engraver Marguerite Hémery (later known as Marguerite Ponce); and her brother was engraver Antoine-François Hémery.

She married the engraver Charles Louis Lingée (c. 1748–1819); and later married artist J. F. Lefèvre.

Lingée was a member of the Royal Academy of Marseille.

Her artwork is in museum collections, including at the Metropolitan Museum of Art in New York City; the Clark Art Institute in Williamstown, Massachusetts; the National Gallery of Denmark in Copenhagen; the British Museum in London; and the National Gallery of Art in Washington, D.C.
