= Statue of George Canning, Parliament Square =

Sculpture by Richard Westmacott in London

Statue of George Canning
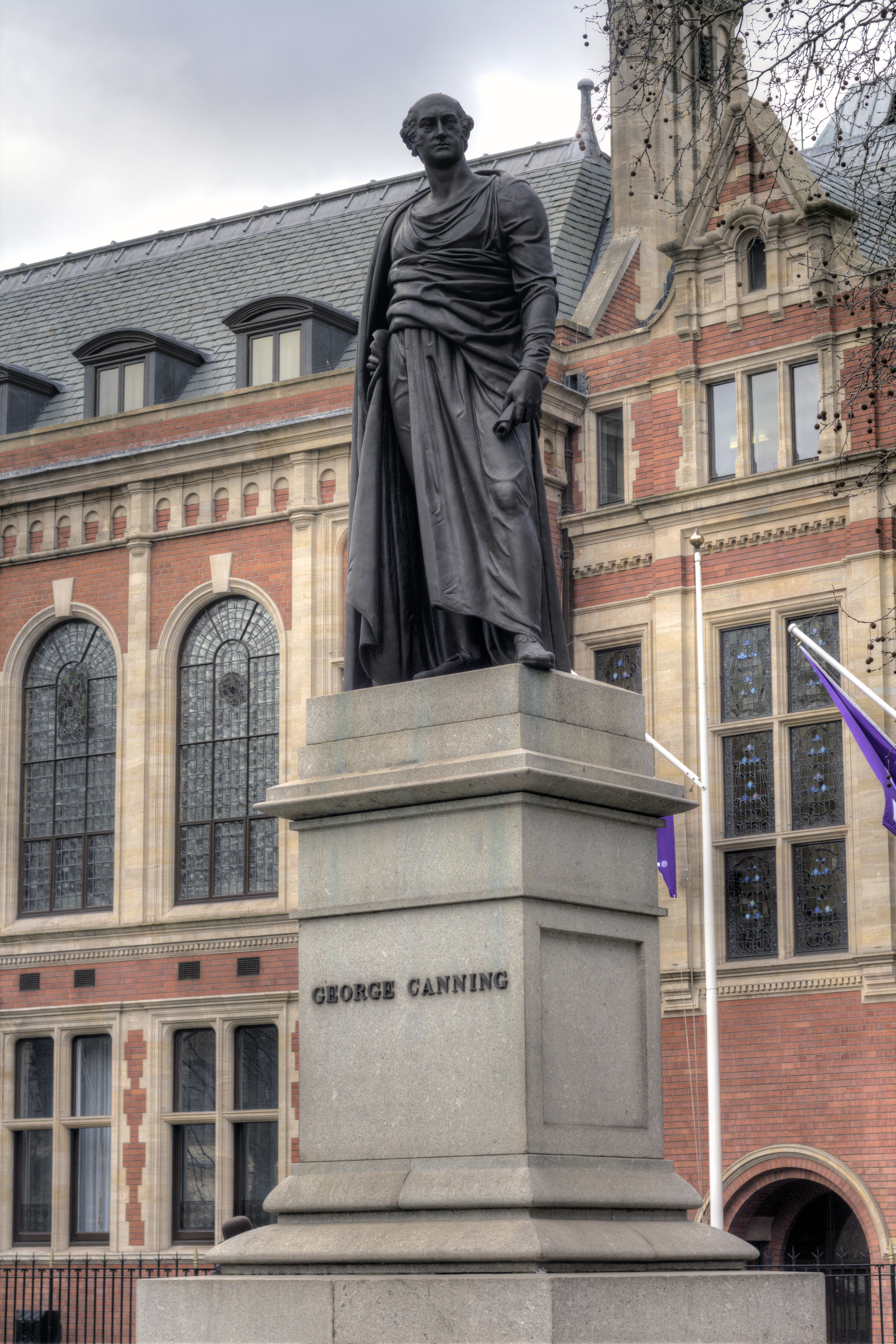
- The statue in 2015
- Artist: Richard Westmacott
- Year: 1832
- Medium: Bronze sculpture
- Location: 51°30′04″N 0°07′40″W

The statue of George Canning in Parliament Square, Westminster, London, is an 1832 work by Sir Richard Westmacott.

== Description ==
The 3.56 metres (11.7 ft) bronze sculpture depicts George Canning (British Prime Minister during 1827) larger than life size, swathed in a long robe and a cloak, holding a scroll in his left hand, similar to a classical statue of an orator from Ancient Rome, although his legs are covered with modern trousers and he has laced shoes on his feet. The statue stands on a 4.4 metres (14 ft) granite plinth which bears the inscription "GEORGE CANNING".

== History ==
The statue was first erected near St Margaret's, Westminster, overlooking Old Palace Yard. It was unveiled there on 2 May 1832, five years after Canning's death in office aged 57 in August 1827. The statue was said to be a good likeness, and was based on a bust made by Francis Chantrey for his memorial at Westminster Abbey.

The statue was moved to Parliament Square in 1867, becoming the first statue in the new square as it was laid out. It stands outside 12 Great George Street, the home of the Royal Institution of Chartered Surveyors, in an area now known as Canning Green. The statue became a Grade II listed building in 1970.

During assembly at Westmacott's studio on 4 January 1832 the statue fell from a hoist resulting in the death of assistant sculptor Vincent Gahagan.

== See also ==
- 1832 in art
