= Louis-Benjamin Francœur =

French mathematician

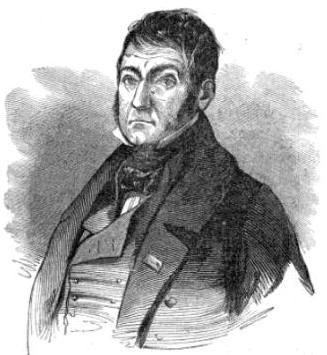
- Louis-Benjamin Francœur
- Born: 16 August 1773; Paris, France
- Died: 15 December 1849 (aged 76); Paris, France
- Scientific career
- Fields: Mathematics; Astronomy

Louis-Benjamin Francœur (1773–1849) was a French mathematician.
