= Gravestone =

Stele or marker, usually stone, placed over a grave

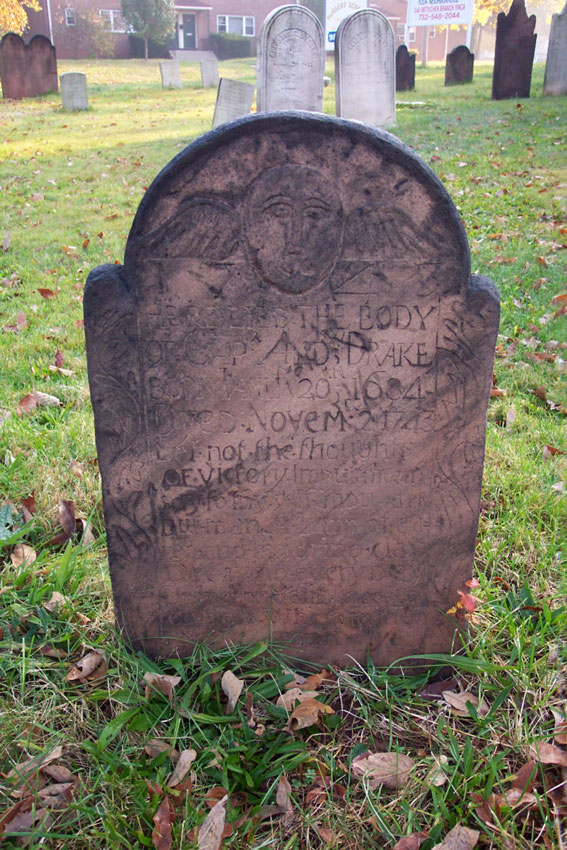
Captain Andrew Drake (1684–1743) sandstone gravestone from the Stelton Baptist Church in Edison, New Jersey

A gravestone or tombstone is a marker, usually made of stone, that is placed over a grave. A marker set at the head of the grave may be called a headstone. An especially old or elaborate stone slab may be called a funeral stele, stela, or slab. The use of such markers is traditional for Chinese, Jewish, Christian, and Islamic burials, as well as other traditions. In East Asia, the tomb's spirit tablet is the focus for ancestral veneration and may be removable for greater protection between rituals. Ancient grave markers typically incorporated funerary art, especially details in stone relief. With greater literacy, markers increasingly included inscriptions of the deceased's name, date of birth, and date of death, often along with a personal message or prayer. The presence of a frame for photographs of the deceased is also increasingly common.

== Use ==
The stele (plural: stelae), as it is called in an archaeological context, is one of the oldest forms of funerary art. Originally, a tombstone was the stone lid of a stone coffin, or the coffin itself, and a gravestone was the stone slab (or ledger stone) that was laid flat over a grave. Now, all three terms ("stele", "tombstone" or "gravestone") are also used for markers set (usually upright) at the head of the grave. Some graves in the 18th century also contained footstones to demarcate the foot end of the grave. This sometimes developed into full kerb sets that marked the whole perimeter of the grave. Footstones were rarely annotated with more than the deceased's initials and year of death, and sometimes a memorial mason and plot reference number. Many cemeteries and churchyards have removed those extra stones to ease grass cutting by machine mower. In some UK cemeteries, the principal, and indeed only, marker is placed at the foot of the grave.

Owing to soil movement and downhill creep on gentle slopes, older headstones and footstones can often be found tilted at an angle. Over time, this movement can result in the stones being sited several metres away from their original location.

Graves and any related memorials are a focus for mourning and remembrance. The names of relatives are often added to a gravestone over the years, so that one marker may chronicle the passing of an entire family spread over decades. Since gravestones and a plot in a cemetery or churchyard cost money, they are also a symbol of wealth or prominence in a community. Some gravestones were even commissioned and erected to their own memory by people who were still living, as a testament to their wealth and status. In a Christian context, the very wealthy often erected elaborate memorials within churches rather than having simply external gravestones. Crematoria frequently offer similar alternatives to families who do not have a grave to mark, but who want a focus for their mourning and for remembrance. Carved or cast commemorative plaques inside the crematorium for example may serve this purpose.

== Materials ==
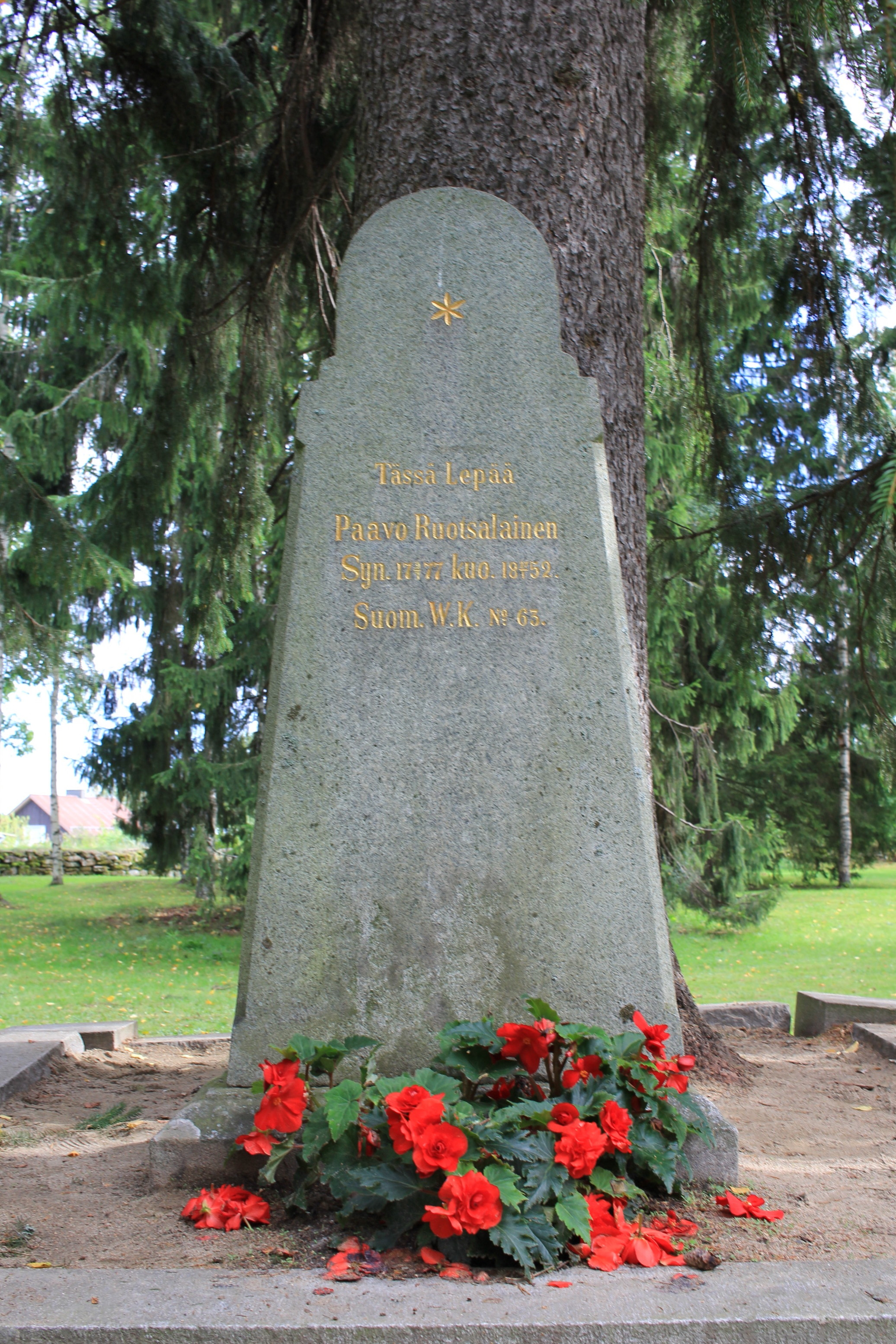
A tombstone at the grave of Paavo Ruotsalainen (1777–1852) in Nilsiä, Kuopio, Finland

A cemetery may follow national codes of practice or independently prescribe the size and use of certain materials, especially in a conservation area. Some may limit the placing of a wooden memorial to six months after burial, after which a more permanent memorial must be placed. Others may require stones of a certain shape or position to facilitate grass-cutting. Headstones of granite, marble and other kinds of stone are usually created, installed, and repaired by monumental masons. Cemeteries require regular inspection and maintenance, as stones may settle, topple and, on rare occasions, fall and injure people; or graves may simply become overgrown and their markers lost or vandalised.

Restoration is a specialized job for a monumental mason. Even overgrowth removal requires care to avoid damaging the carving. For example, ivy should only be cut at the base roots and left to naturally die off, never pulled off forcefully.

Many materials have been used as markers.

=== Stone ===
- Fieldstones. In many cultures markers for graves other than enclosed areas, such as planted with characteristic plants particularly in northern Europe the yew, were natural fieldstones, some unmarked and others decorated or incised using a metal awl. Typical motifs for the carving included a symbol and the deceased's name and age.
- Granite. Granite is a hard stone and requires skill to carve by hand. Modern methods of carving include using computer-controlled rotary bits and sandblasting over a rubber stencil. Leaving the letters, numbers and emblems exposed on the stone, the blaster can create virtually any kind of artwork or epitaph. Granite is one of the most durable stones used for gravestones.
- Marble and limestone. Both limestone and marble take carving well. Marble is a recrystallised form of limestone. They are often chosen because of their appearance and light color. Air pollution, and especially the mild acid in rainwater, slowly dissolves marble and limestone over time, which can make inscriptions unreadable. Portland stone was a type of limestone commonly used in England; after weathering, fossiliferous deposits tend to appear on the surface. Marble became popular from the early 19th century, though its extra cost limited its appeal.
- Sandstone. Sandstone is durable, yet soft enough to carve easily. Some sandstone markers are so well preserved that individual chisel marks are discernible, while others have delaminated and crumbled to dust. Delamination occurs when moisture gets between the layers of the sandstone. As it freezes and expands the layers flake off. In the 17th century, sandstone replaced field stones in Colonial America. Yorkstone was a common sandstone material used in England.
- Slate. Slate can have a pleasing texture but is slightly porous and prone to delamination. Slate was commonly used by colonial New England carvers, especially in Boston where elaborate slate markers were shipped down the Atlantic coast as far south as Charleston and Savanah. It takes lettering well, often highlighted with white paint or gilding.
- Schist. Schist was a common material for grave making in the American colonies during the 17th and 18th centuries. While harder to carve than sandstone or slate, lettering and symbols usually had to be carved deeper into the stone and therefore held up well over long periods of time. While not as durable as most slate, most have held up well against the elements.
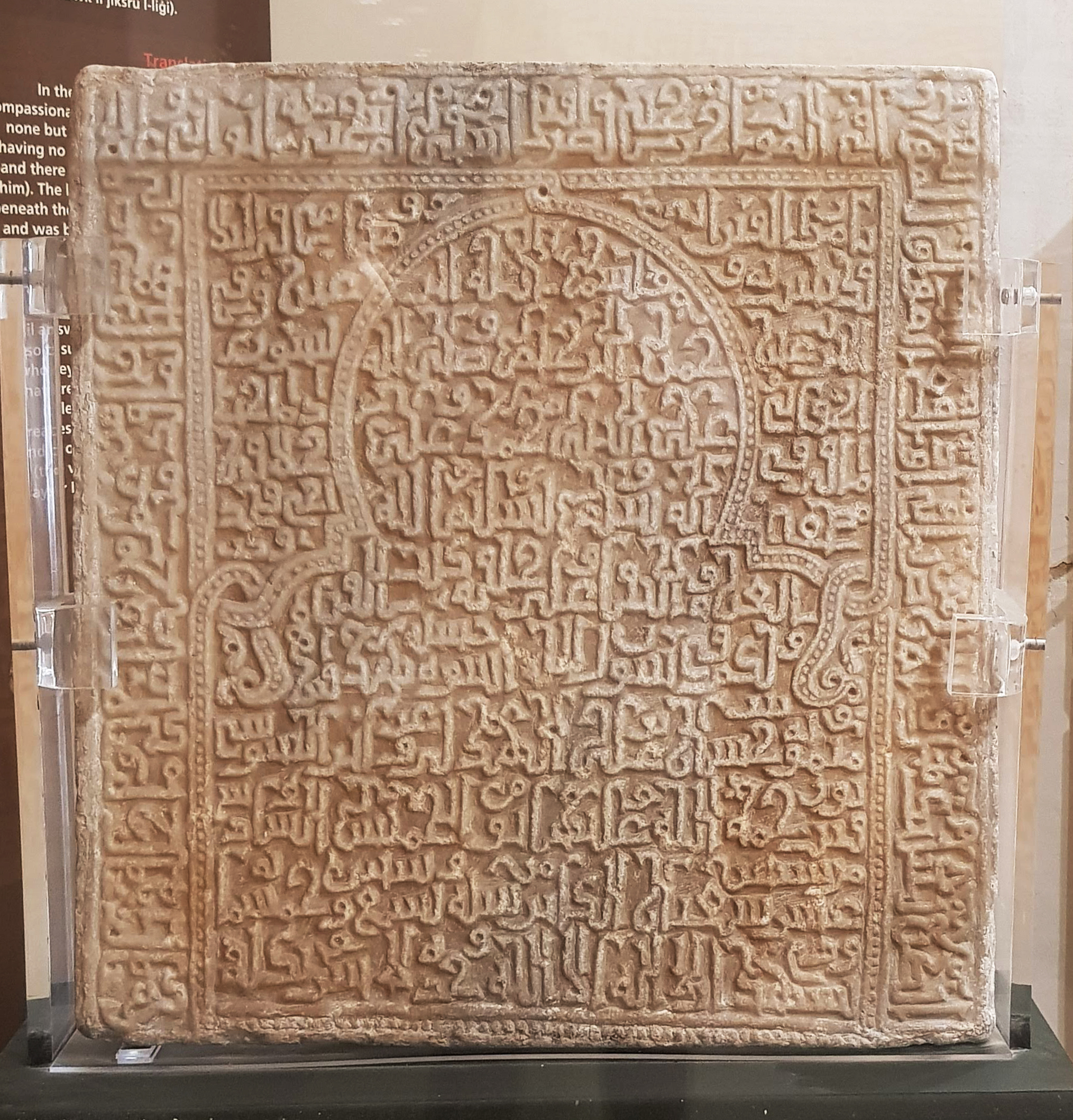
The Maymūnah Stone, a tombstone with an Arabic inscription dated 1174 on a reused Roman marble block. Now exhibited at the Gozo Museum of Archaeology in Malta.

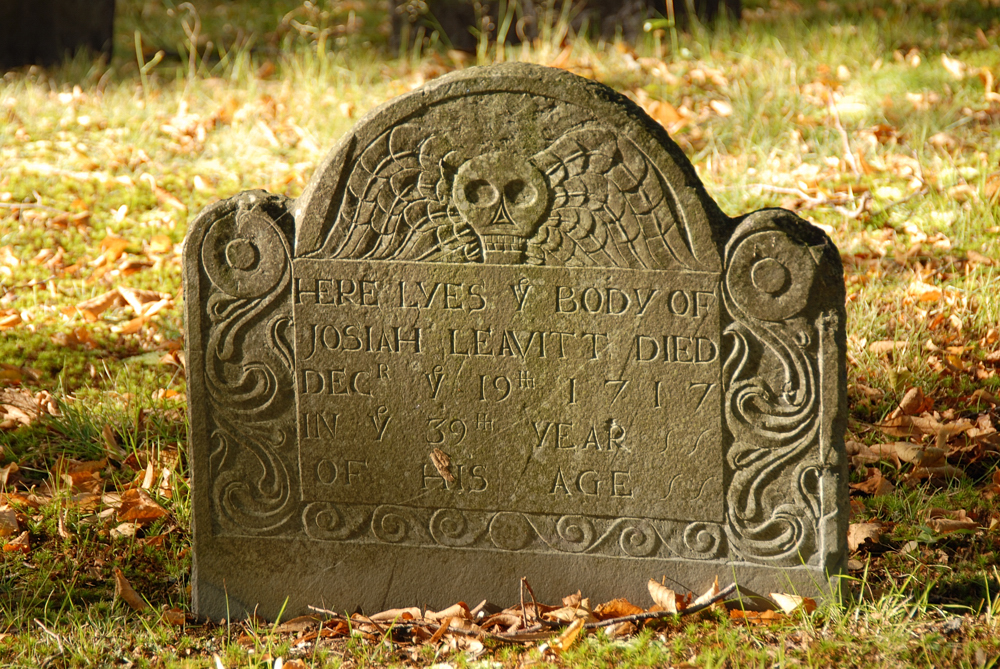
Slate gravestone of Josiah Leavitt (1679–1717), Hingham Center Cemetery, Hingham, Plymouth County, Massachusetts

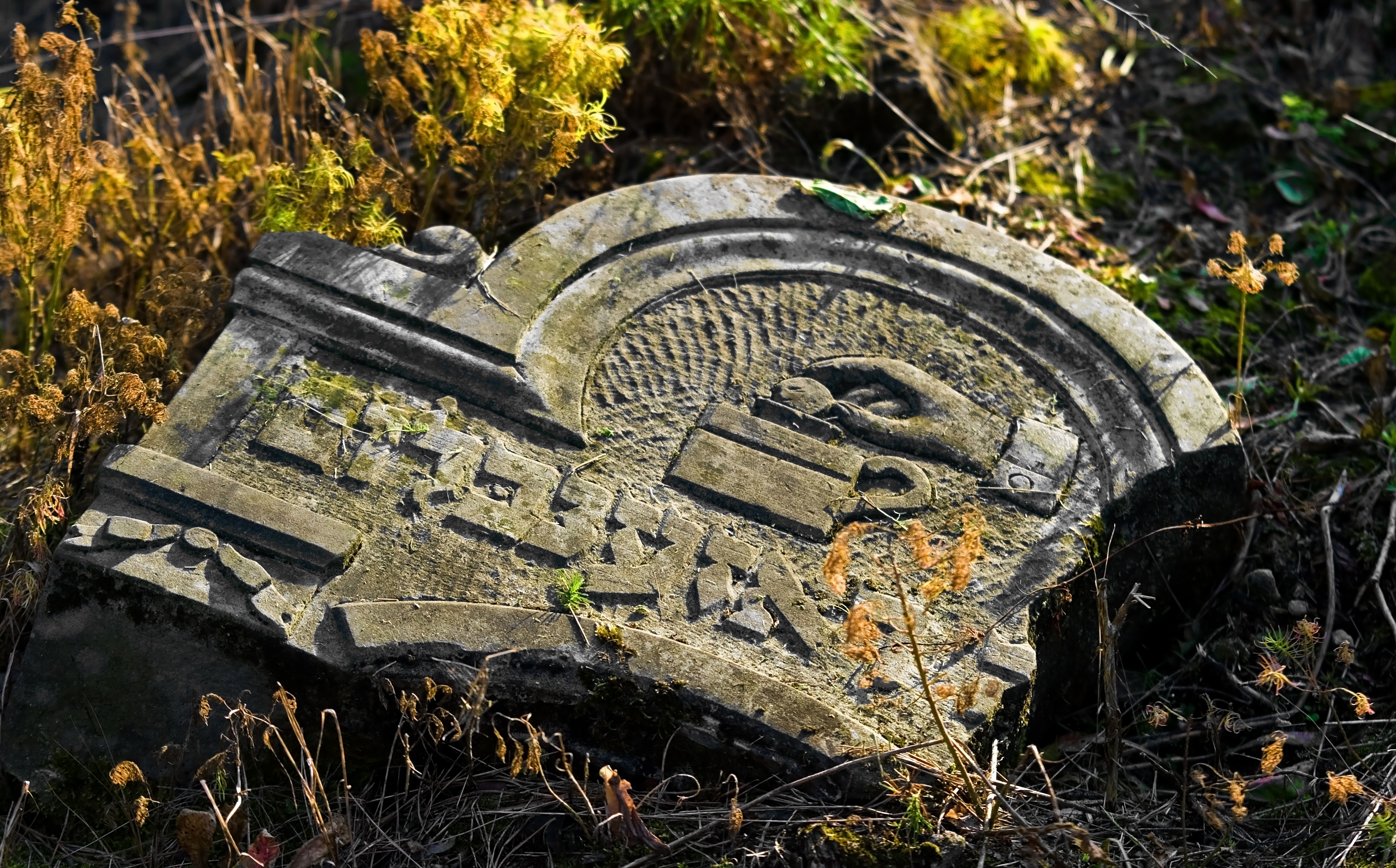
Slate vestige of a Jewish gravestone depicting a tzedakah box. Jewish cemetery in Otwock (Karczew-Anielin), Poland.

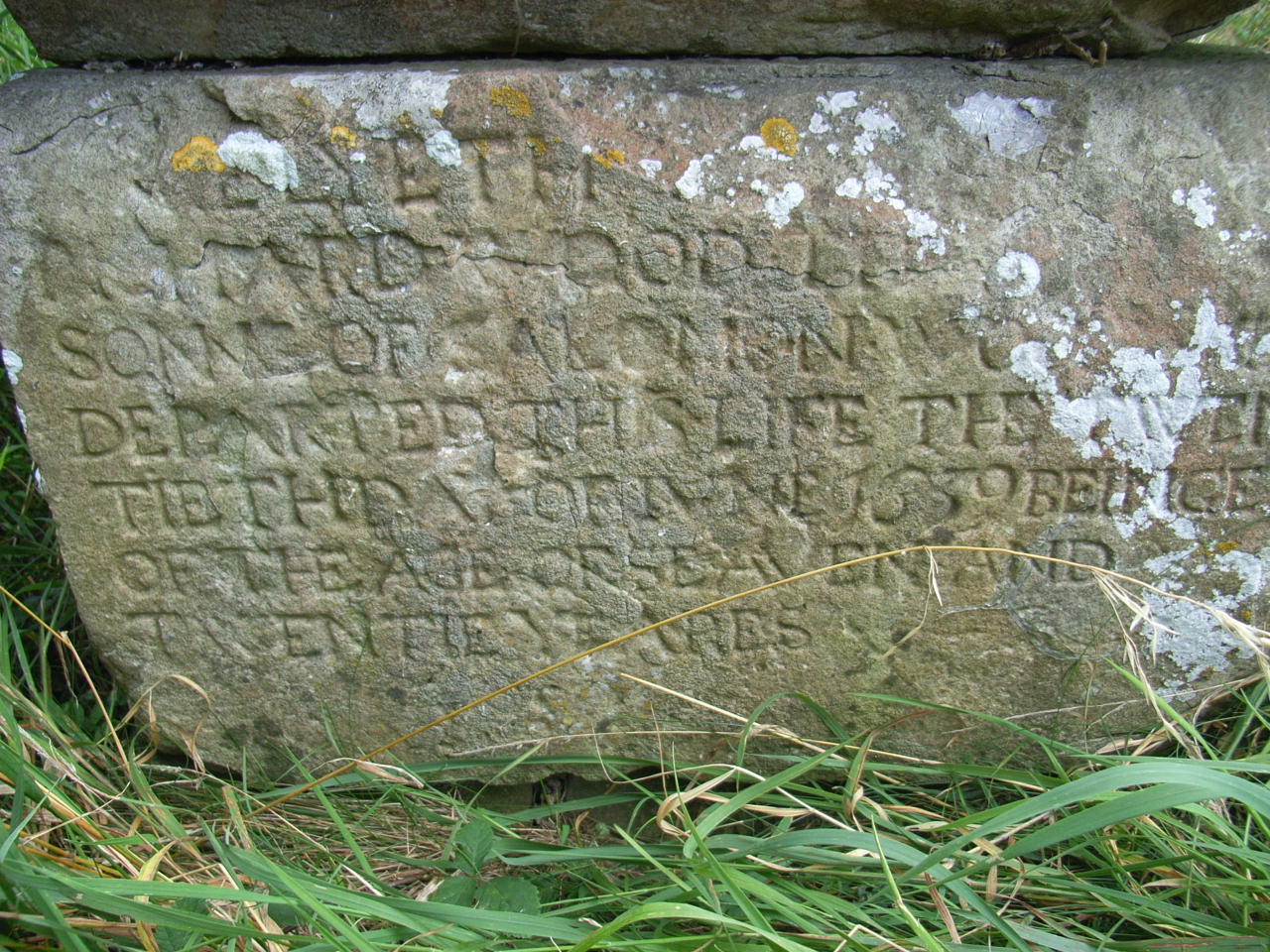
Gravestone showing death date of 1639, Wormshill, Kent, England

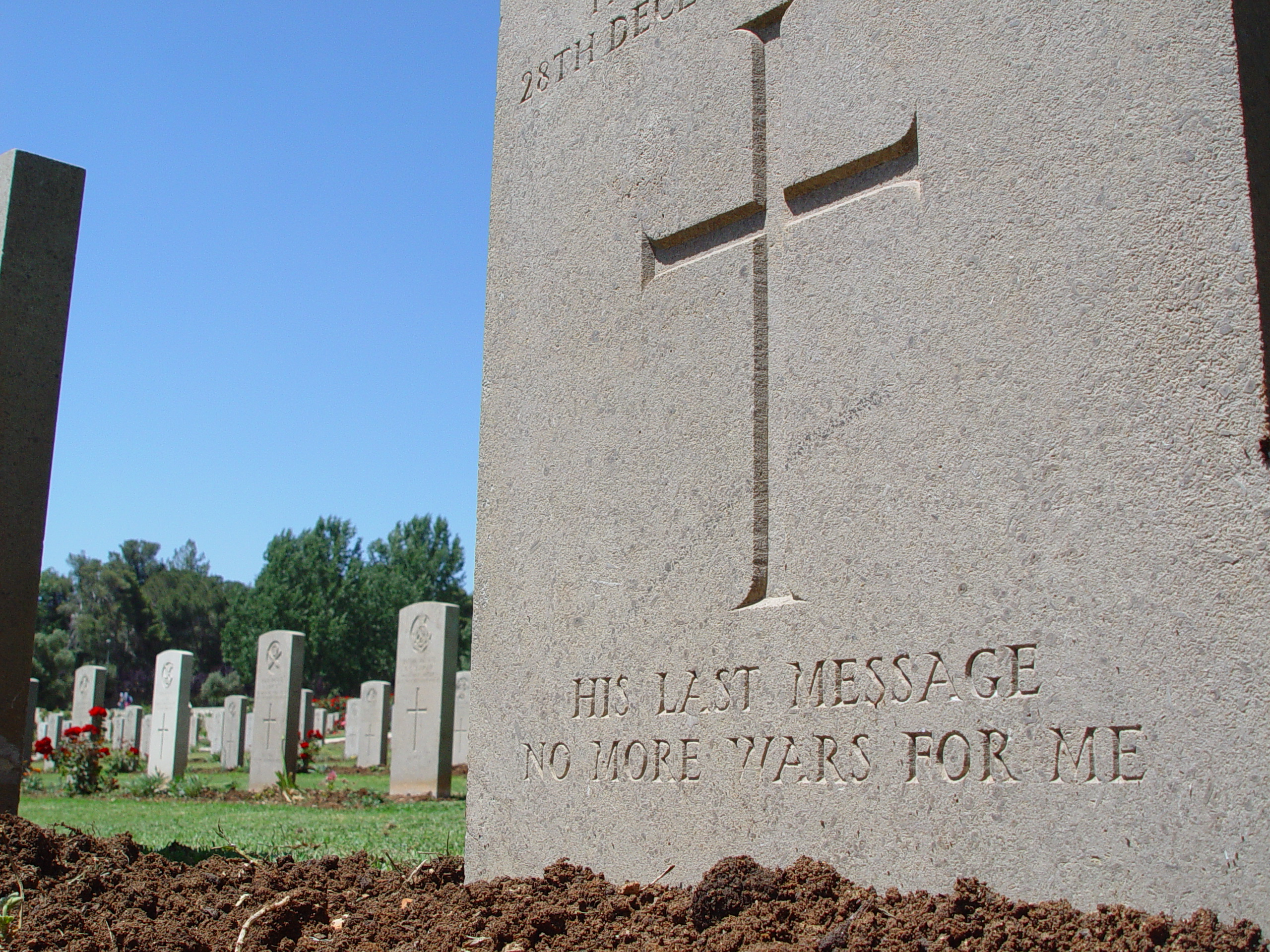
HIS LAST MESSAGE: NO MORE WARS FOR ME – A headstone in the Jerusalem British World War I Cemetery on Mount Scopus

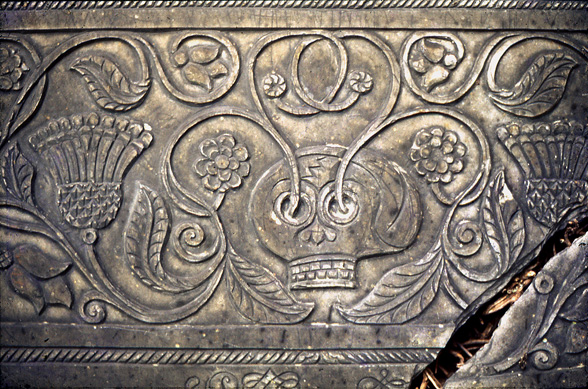
Elaborately carved grave slab at Shebbear (Devon, England) showing a skull sprouting flowering shoots, as a symbol of resurrection

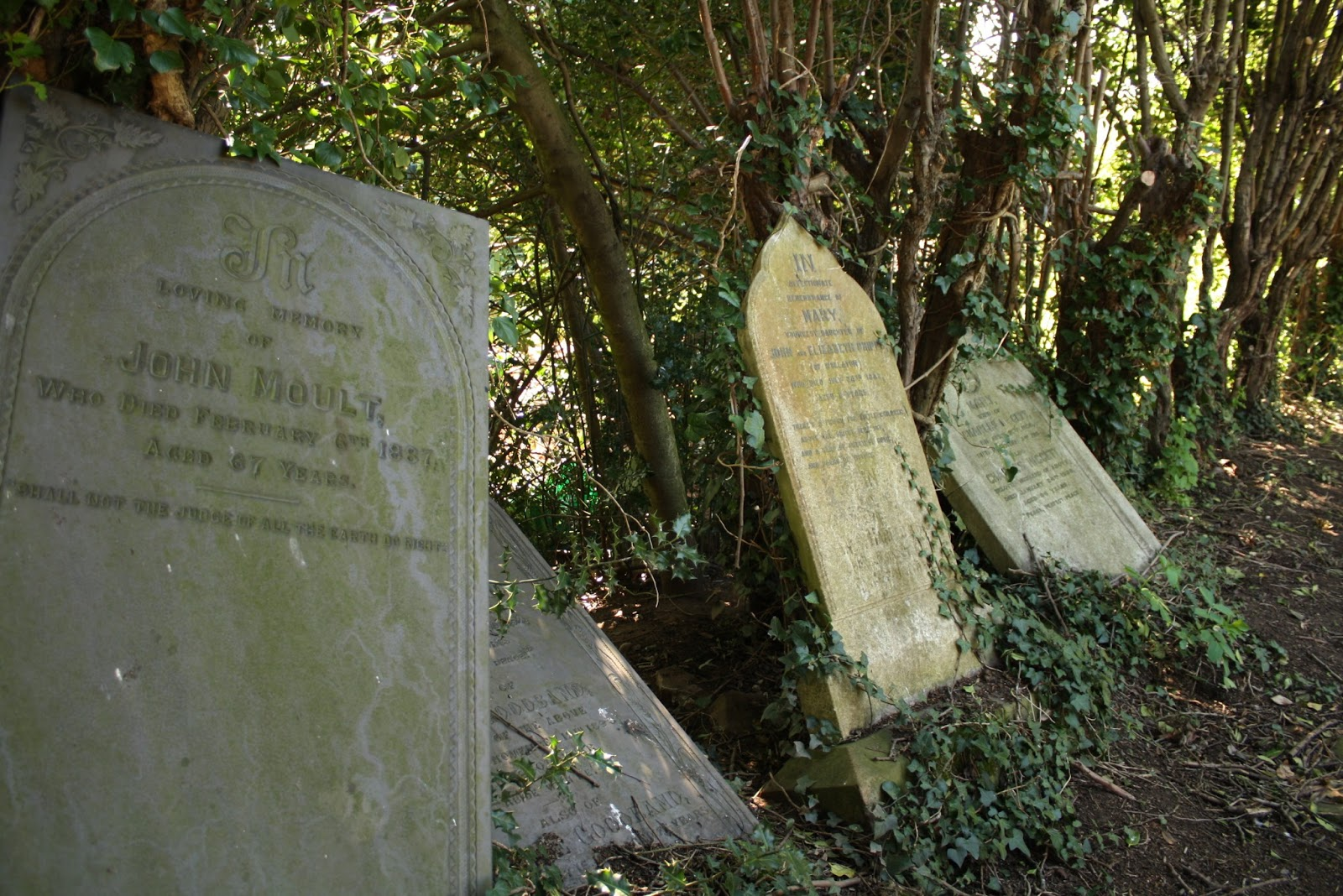
Tottering Victorian headstones
in Woolaton, in Nottingham, England

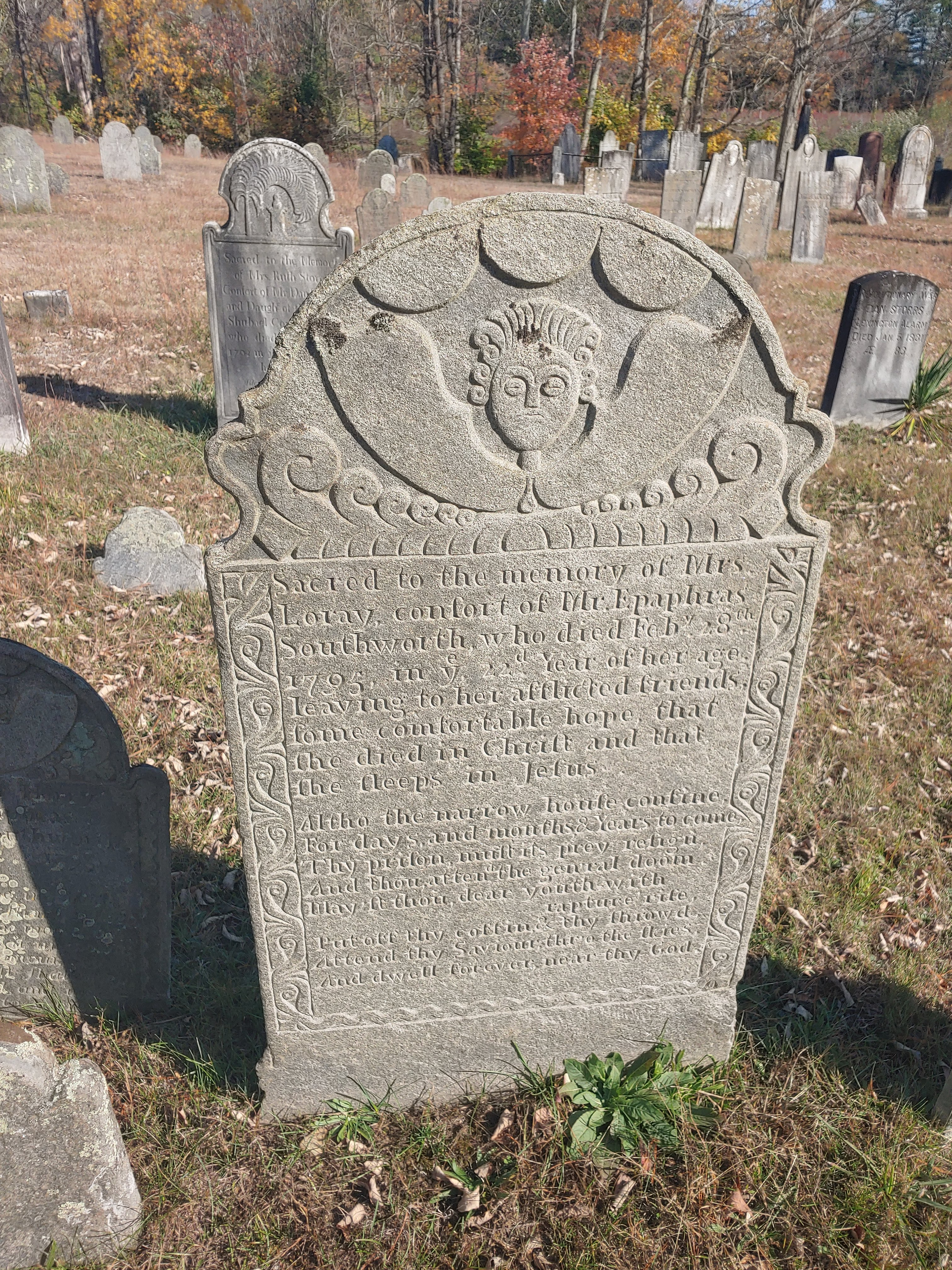
Schist tombstone dated 1795, carved by Josiah Manning in Mansfield CT

Tombstone from 1724 inside the Church of the Concepción. La Laguna, Tenerife, Spain.

=== Metal ===
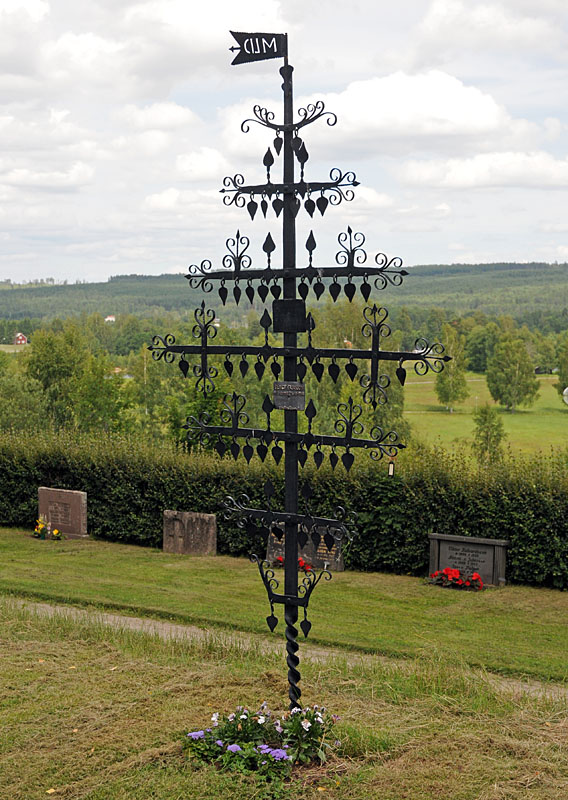
Iron cross on a grave in Ekshärad cemetery

- Iron. Iron grave markers and decorations were popular during the Victorian era in the United Kingdom and elsewhere, often being produced by specialist foundries or the local blacksmith. Cast iron headstones have lasted for generations while wrought ironwork often only survives in a rusted or eroded state. In eastern Värmland, Sweden, iron crosses instead of stones have been popular since the 18th century.
- White bronze. Actually sand cast zinc, but called white bronze for marketing purposes. Almost all, if not all, zinc grave markers were made by the Monumental Bronze Company of Bridgeport, CT, between 1874 and 1914. The company set up subsidiaries in Detroit, Philadelphia, New Orleans, and Des Moines; a Chicago subsidiary was named the American Bronze Company, while the St. Thomas White Bronze Monument Company was set up in Ontario, Canada. They are in cemeteries of the period all across the U.S. and Canada. They were sold as more durable than marble, about 1/3 less expensive and progressive.

=== Wood and plants ===
- Wood. This was a popular material during the Georgian and Victorian era, and almost certainly before, in Great Britain and elsewhere. Some could be very ornate, although few survive beyond 50–100 years due to natural decomposition or termites and other wood boring insects. In Hungary, the kopjafa is a traditional carved wooden grave marker.
- Planting. Trees or shrubs, particularly roses, may be planted, especially to mark the location of ashes. This may be accompanied by a small inscribed metal or wooden marker.
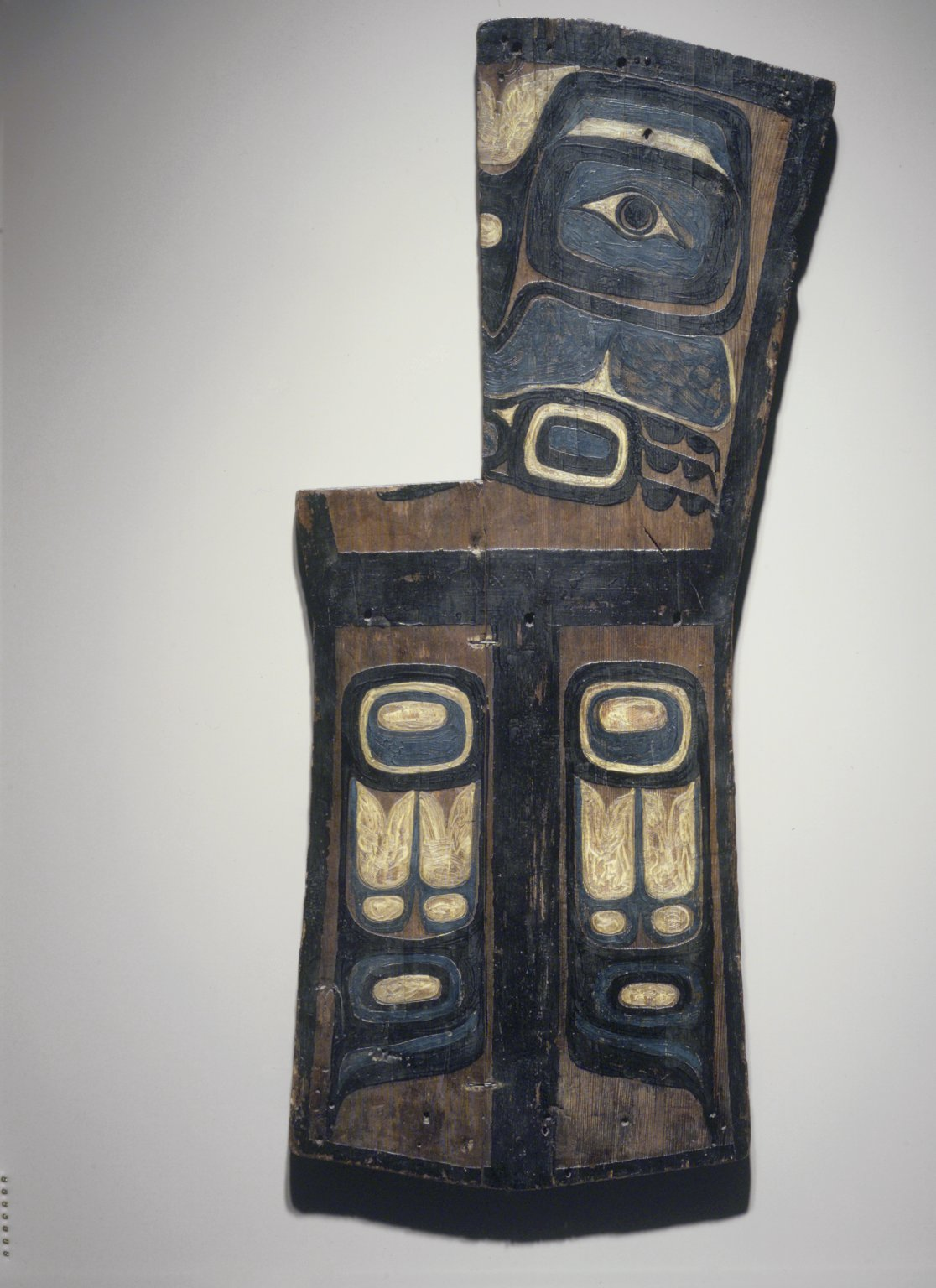
Grave Marker, Gwa'sala Kwakwaka'wakw (Native American), late 19th century, wood, pigment, Brooklyn Museum

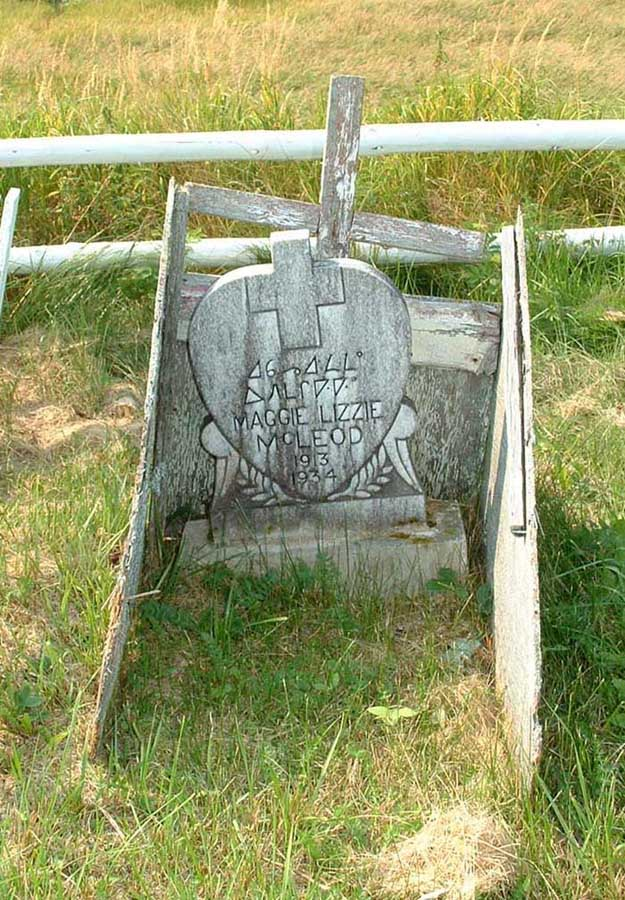
Wood grave marker using Canadian Syllabics

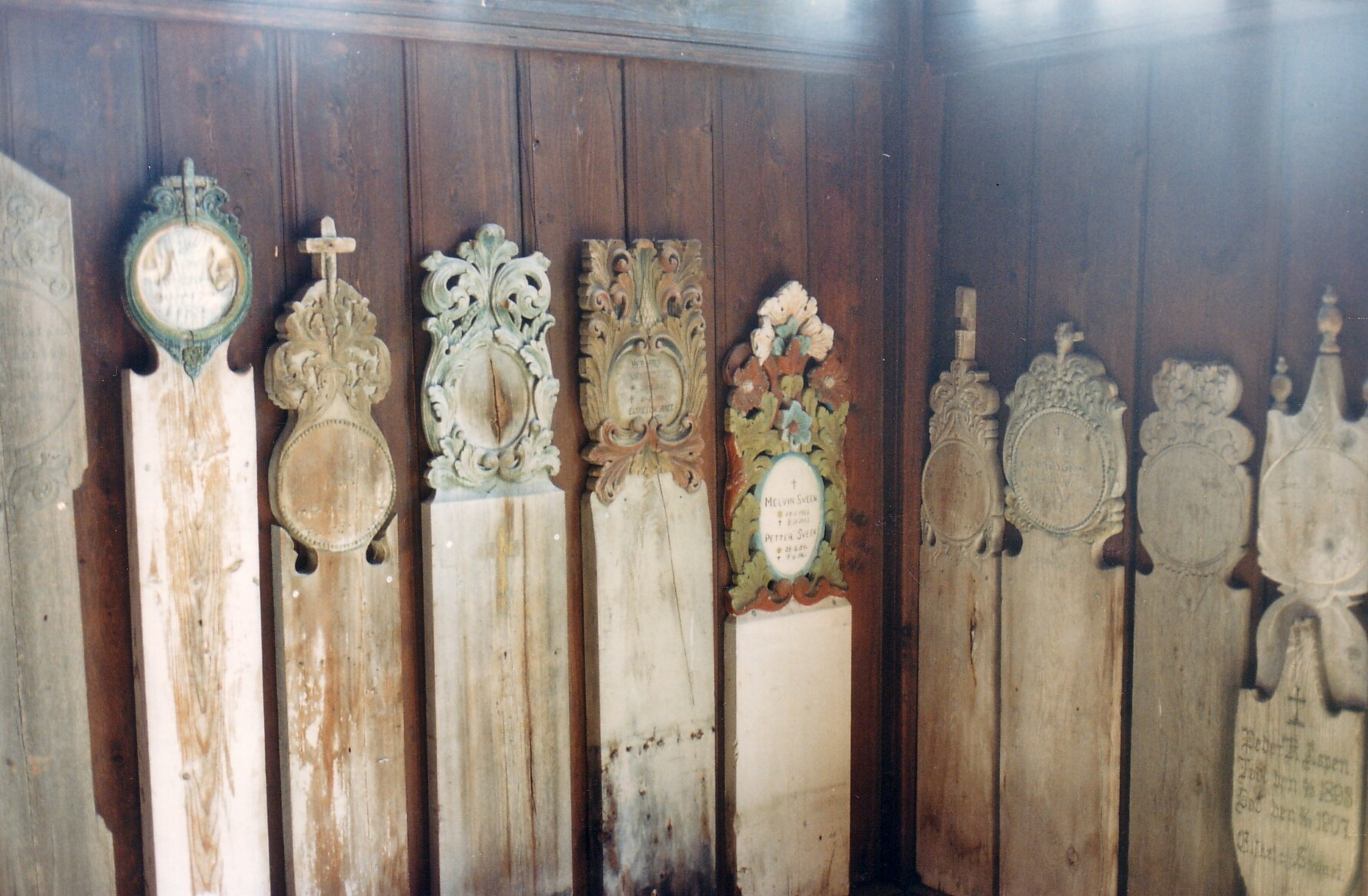
Wooden grave markers stored at Heidal Church, Norway

== Inscriptions ==
Markers sometimes bear inscriptions. The information on the headstone generally includes the name of the deceased and their date of birth and death. Such information can be useful to genealogists and local historians. Larger cemeteries may require a discreet reference code as well to help accurately fix the location for maintenance. The cemetery owner, church, or, as in the UK, national guidelines might encourage the use of 'tasteful' and accurate wording in inscriptions. The placement of inscriptions is traditionally placed on the forward-facing side of the memorial but can also be seen in some cases on the reverse and around the edges of the stone itself. Some families request that an inscription be made on the portion of the memorial that will be underground.

In addition, some gravestones also bear epitaphs in praise of the deceased or quotations from religious texts, such as "requiescat in pace". In a few instances the inscription is in the form of a plea, admonishment, testament of faith, claim to fame or even a curse – William Shakespeare's inscription famously declares

Good friend, for Jesus' sake forbear,
To dig the dust enclosèd here.
Blest be the man that spares these stones,
And cursed be he that moves my bones.

Or a warning about mortality, such as this Persian poetry carved on an ancient tombstone in the Tajiki capital of Dushanbe.

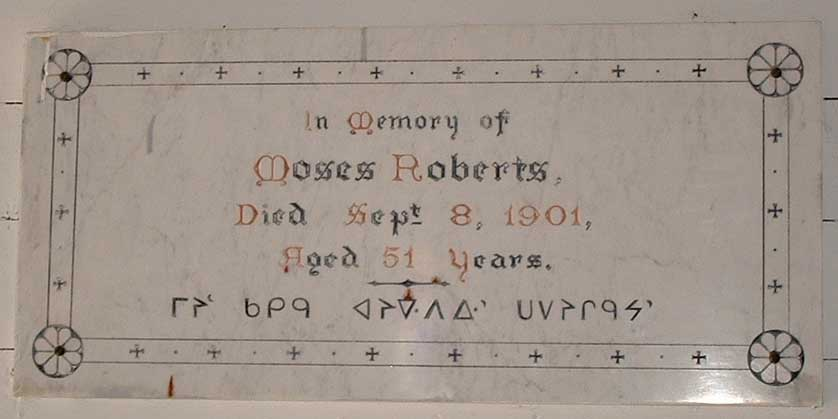
Gravestone in Canada with indigenous language inscription in Canadian Aboriginal Syllabics

I heard that mighty Jamshed the King
Carved on a stone near a spring of water these words:
"Many – like us – sat here by this spring
And left this life in the blink of an eye.
We captured the whole world through our courage and strength,
Yet could take nothing with us to our grave."

Or a simpler warning of inevitability of death:

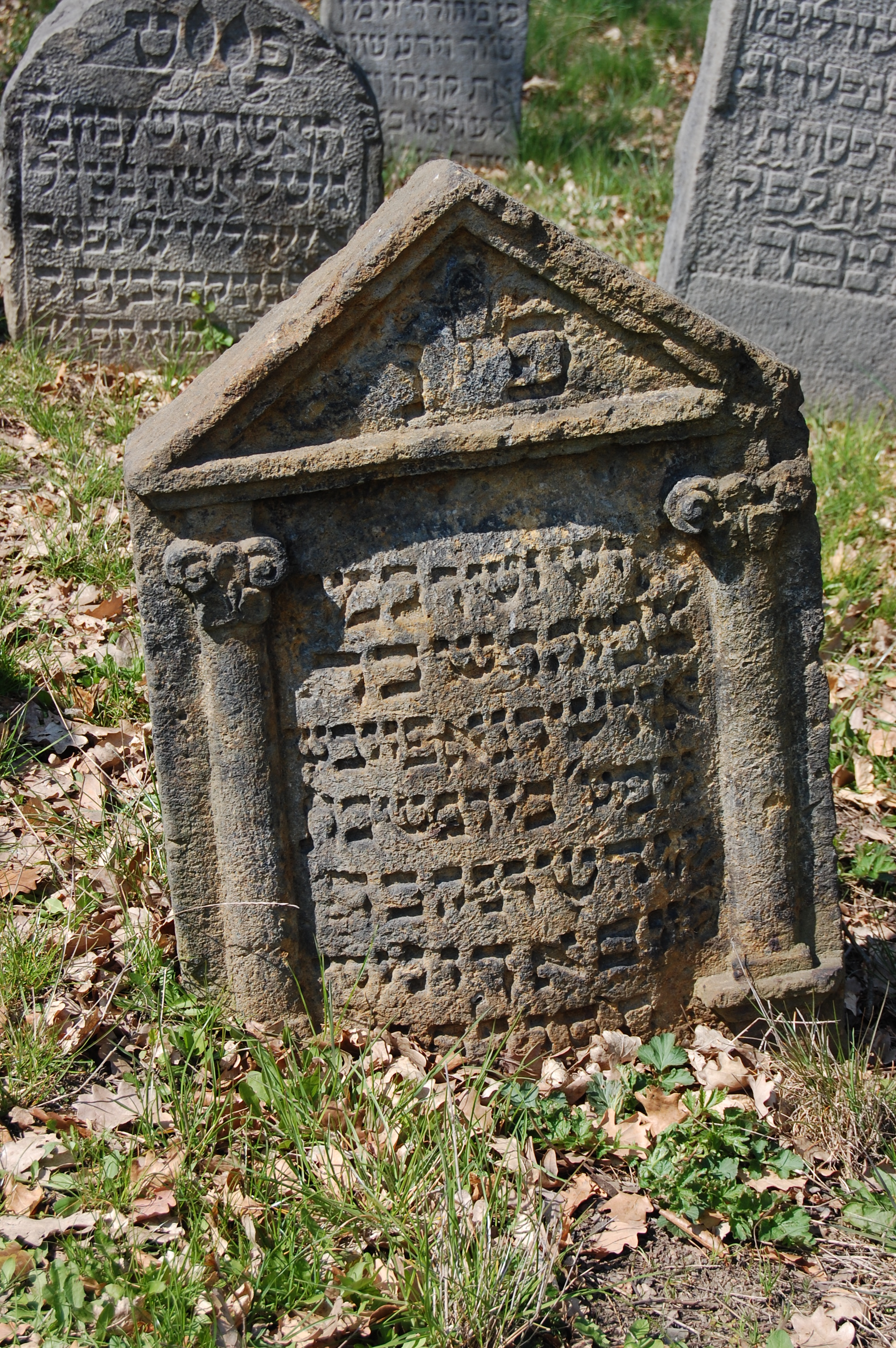
Hebrew inscriptions on gravestones in Sobědruhy, Czech Republic

Remember me as you pass by,
As you are now, so once was I,
As I am now, so you will be,
Prepare for death and follow me.

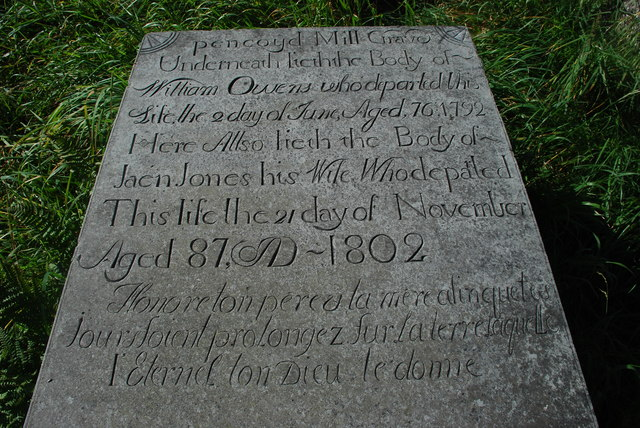
Multilingual gravestone in Llangybi, Gwynedd, Wales: Welsh, English, French

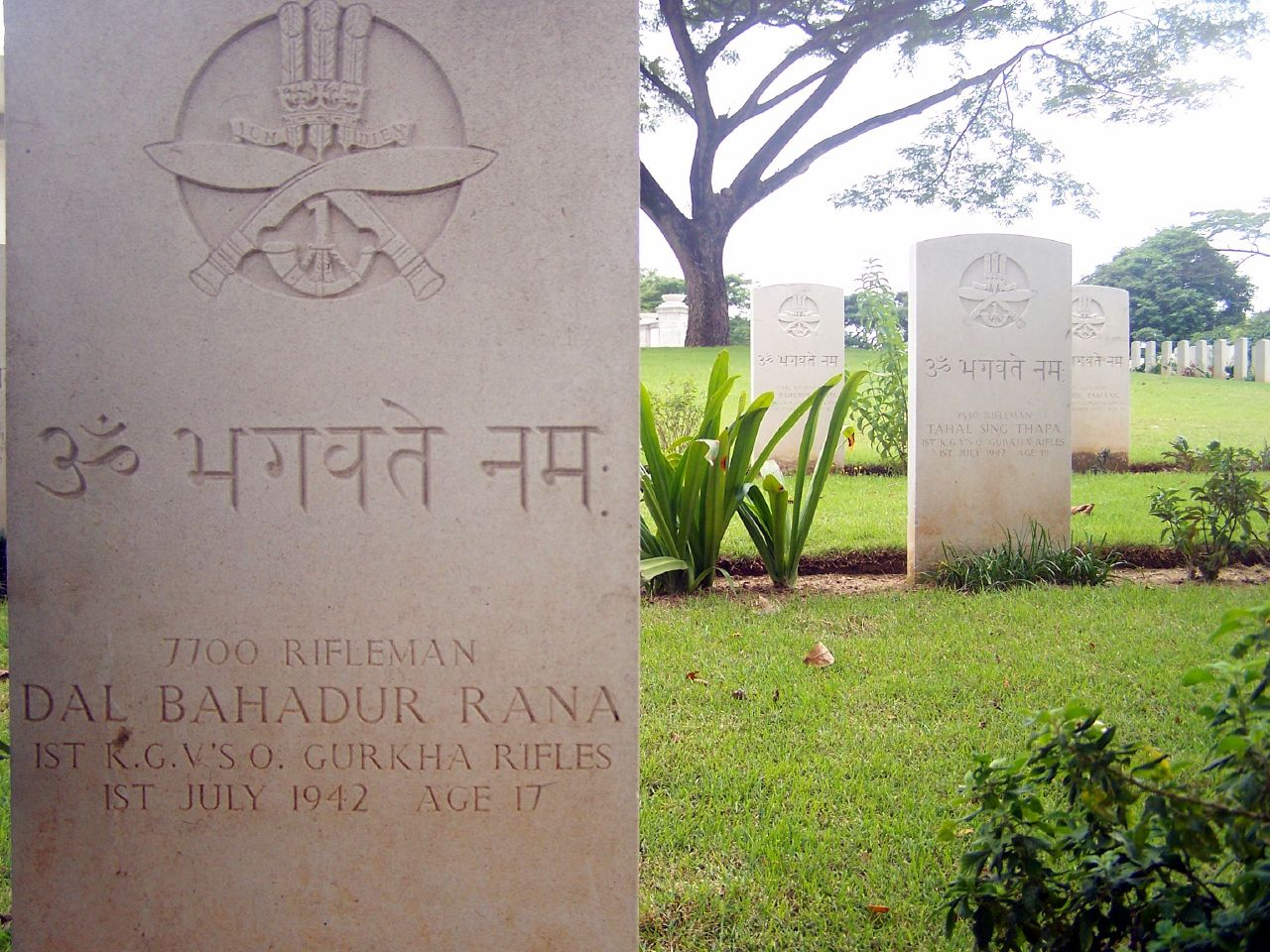
Gurkha soldier's stone in Singapore

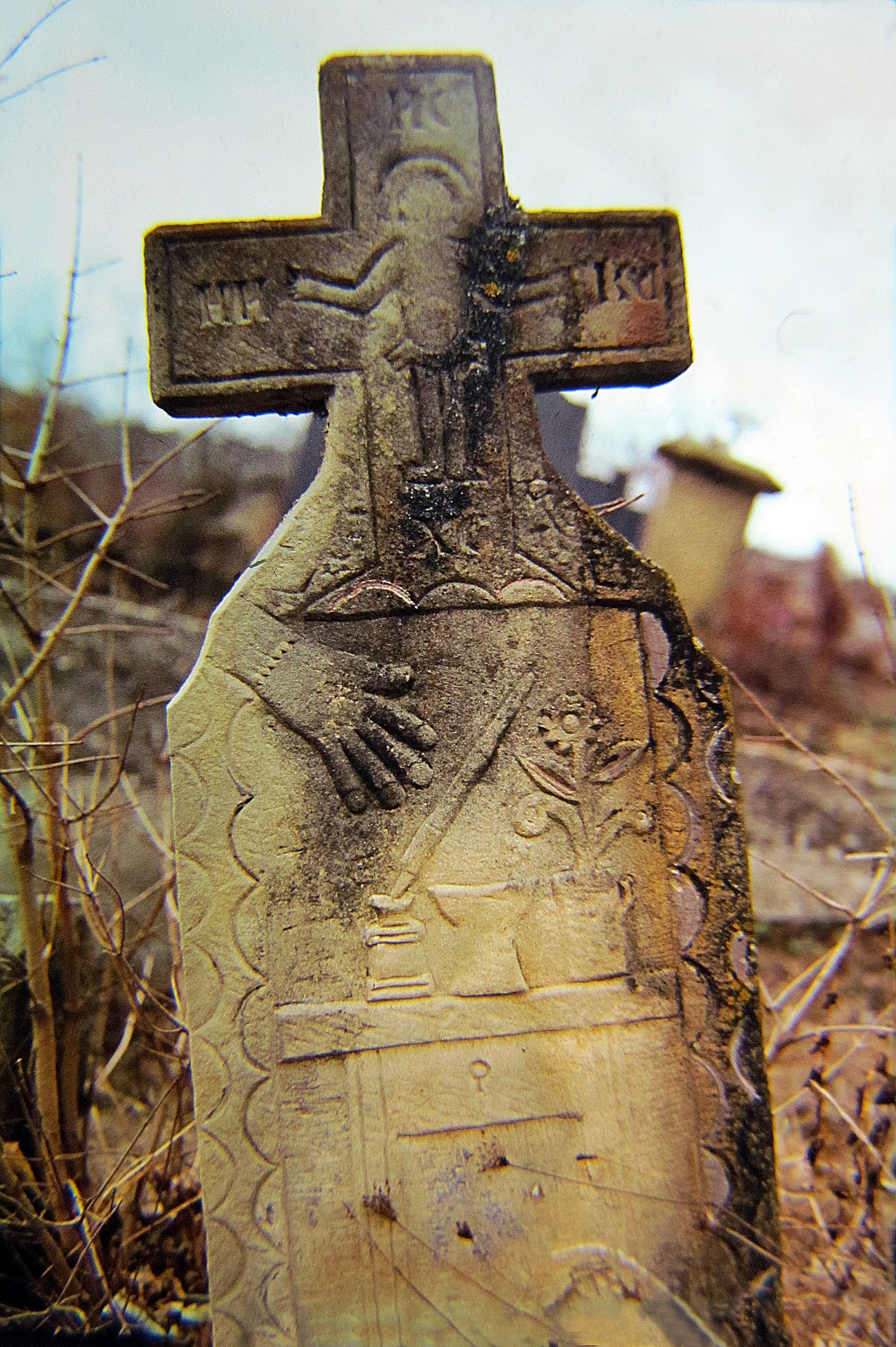
Serbian women's stone in Gornja Gorevnica, Serbia

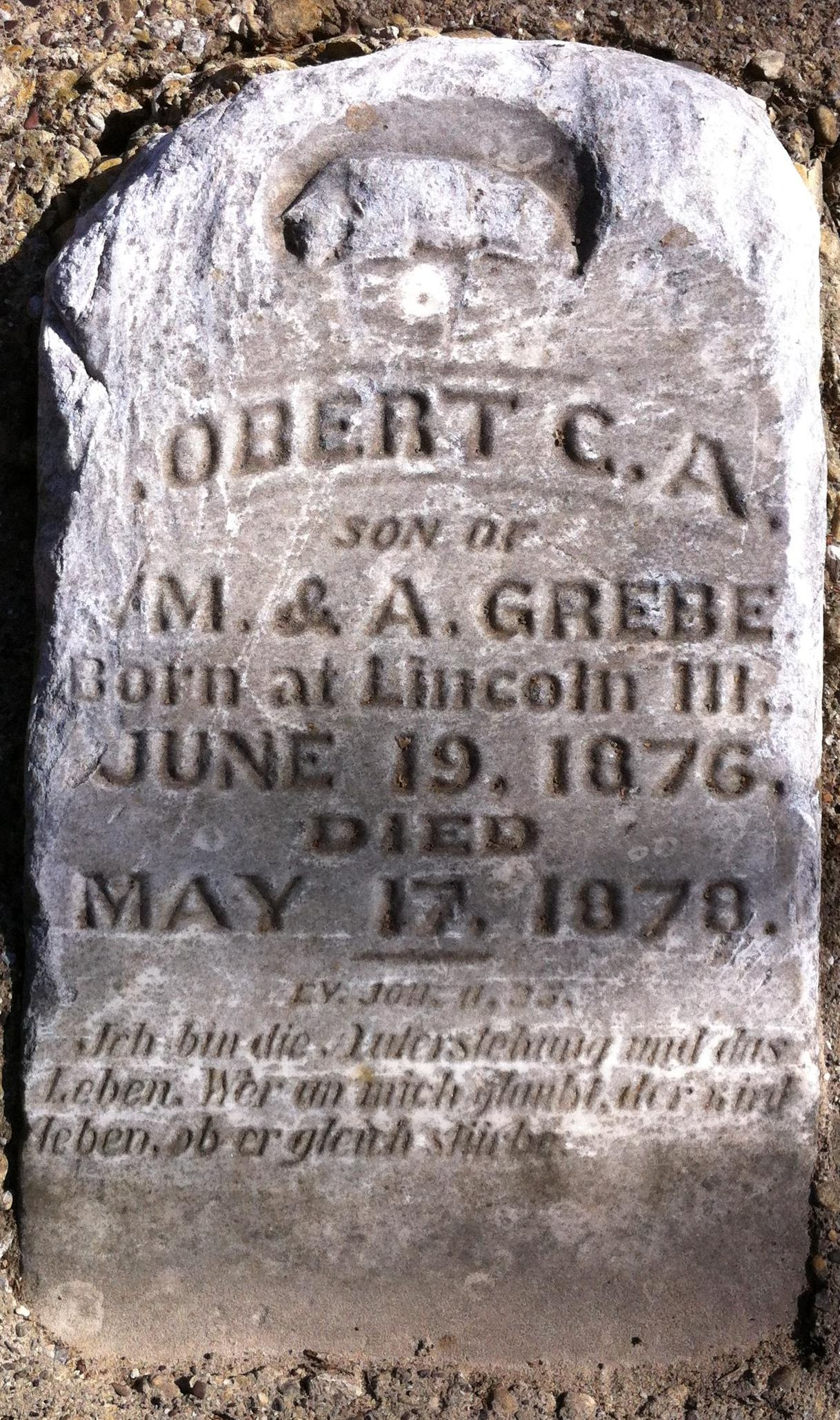
Information in English, Bible verse in German (Dallas, TX)

Headstone engravers faced their own "year 2000 problem" when still-living people, as many as 500,000 in the United States alone, pre-purchased headstones with pre-carved death years beginning with 19–.

Bas-relief carvings of a religious nature or of a profile of the deceased can be seen on some headstones, especially up to the 19th century. Since the invention of photography, a gravestone might include a framed photograph or cameo of the deceased; photographic images or artwork (showing the loved one, or some other image relevant to their life, interests or achievements) are sometimes now engraved onto smooth stone surfaces.

Some headstones use lettering made of white metal fixed into the stone, which is easy to read but can be damaged by ivy or frost. Deep carvings on a hard-wearing stone may weather many centuries exposed in graveyards and still remain legible. Those fixed on the inside of churches, on the walls, or on the floor (often as near the altar as possible) may last much longer: such memorials were often embellished with a monumental brass. Irish geologist Patrick Wyse Jackson mused on gravestone legibility in 1993 with regards to the different types of stone available:

The use of slate for this plaque was a good choice as it weathers very slowly and the quality of the carved lettering remains good for many years. Many (Irish) gravestones from the mid 1700s and 1800s are made of slate. This is fortunate for those interested in tracing genealogies, as many of the inscriptions can still be read after two hundred years. This contrasts sharply with lettering cut into granite, which is illegible after about a hundred years... For those of you who seek a degree of immortality, a slate headstone, or as a second choice, one carved from an Irish limestone, should ensure that your name will remain on view for several centuries to come!

The choice of language and/or script on gravestones has been studied by sociolinguists as indicators of language choices and language loyalty. For example, by studying cemeteries used by immigrant communities, some languages were found to be carved "long after the language ceased to be spoken" in the communities. In other cases, a language used in the inscription may indicate a religious affiliation.

== Form and decoration ==
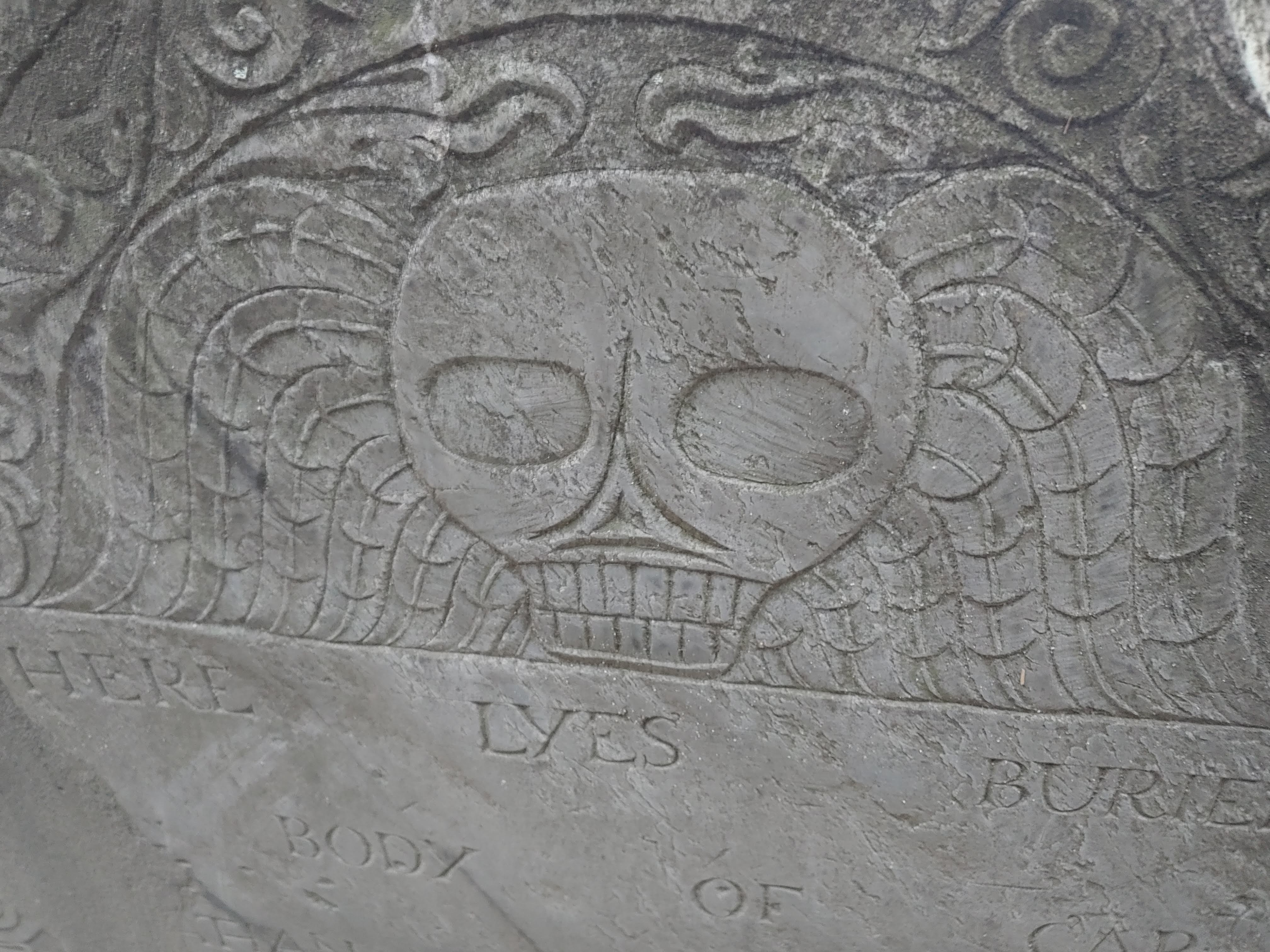
Typical Death's Head design, often used on tombstones in Colonial America (Boston MA)

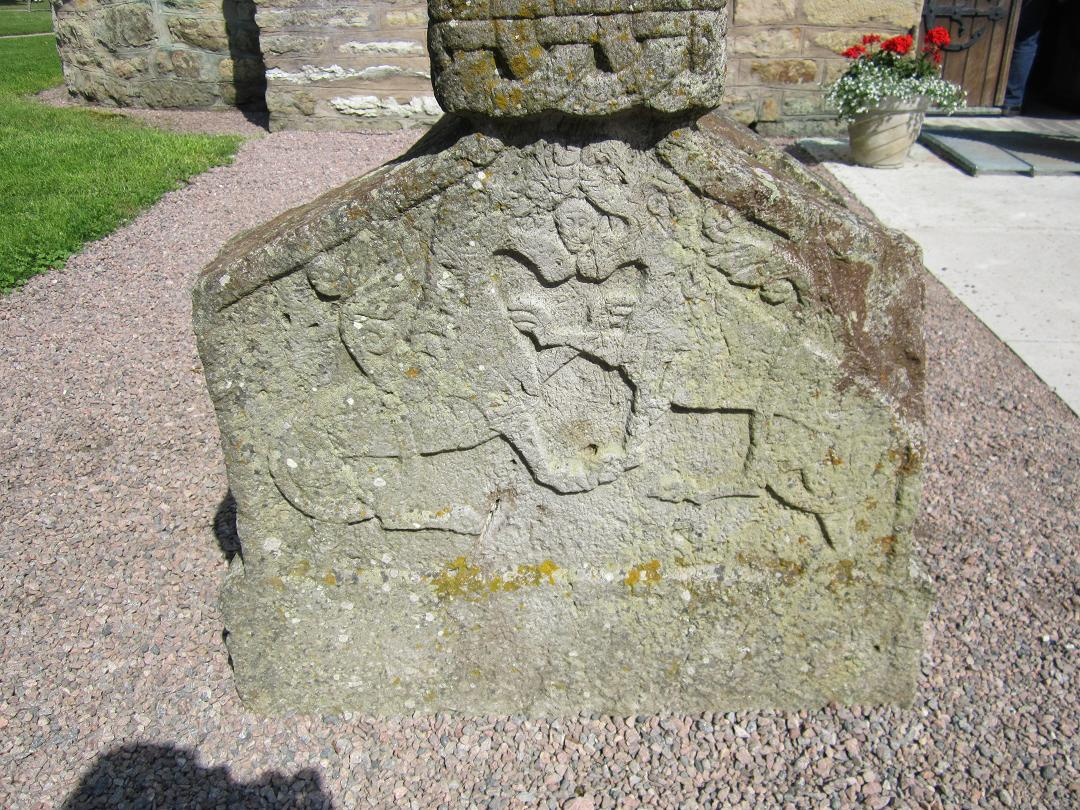
An equestrian motif on an 11th-century Swedish gravestone

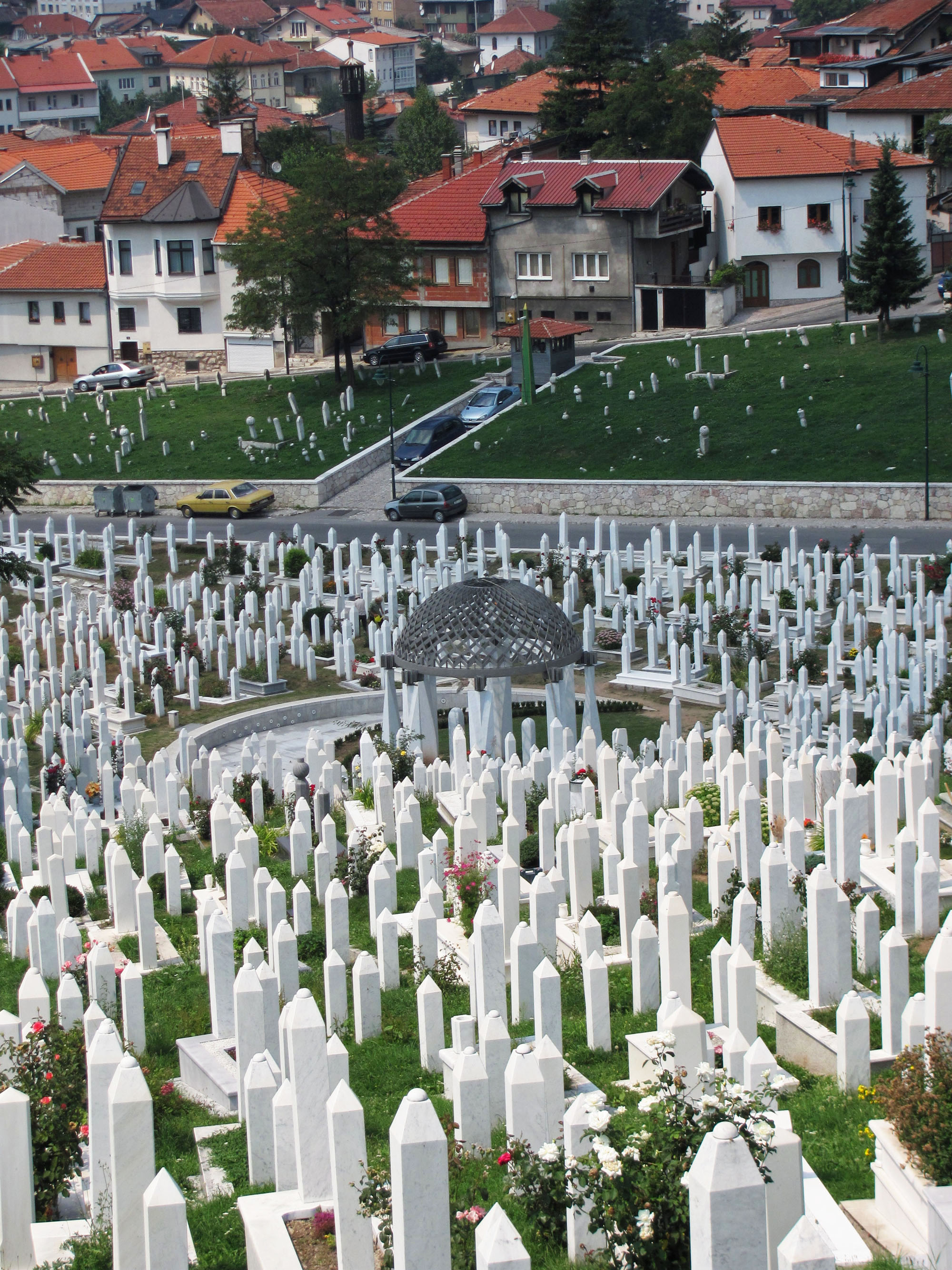
Islamic cemetery in Sarajevo, with columnar headstones

Gravestones may be simple upright slabs with semi-circular, rounded, gabled, pointed-arched, pedimental, square or other shaped tops. During the 18th century, they were often decorated with memento mori (symbolic reminders of death) such as skulls or winged skulls, winged cherub heads, heavenly crowns, or the picks and shovels of the gravedigger. Somewhat unusual were more elaborate allegorical figures, such as Old Father Time, or emblems of trade or status, or even some event from the life of the deceased (particularly how they died). Large tomb chests, false sarcophagi as the actual remains were in the earth below, or smaller coped chests were commonly used by the gentry as a means of commemorating a number of members of the same family. In the 19th century, headstone styles became very diverse, ranging from plain to highly decorated, and often using crosses on a base or other shapes differing from the traditional slab. By this time popular designs were shifting from symbols of death like Winged heads and Skulls to Urns and Willow trees. Marble also became overwhelmingly popular as a grave material during the 1800s in the United States. More elaborately carved markers, such as crosses or angels also became popular during this time. Simple curb surrounds, sometimes filled with glass chippings, were popular during the mid-20th century.

Islamic headstones are traditionally more a rectangular upright shaft, often topped with a carved topknot symbolic of a turban; but in Western countries more local styles are often used.

Some form of simple decoration may be employed. Special emblems on tombstones indicate several familiar themes in many faiths. Some examples are:

- Anchor: Steadfast hope
- Angel of grief: Sorrow
- Arch: Rejoined with partner in Heaven
- Birds: The soul
- Book: Faith, wisdom
- Cherub: Divine wisdom or justice
- Column: Noble life
- Broken column: Early death
- Conch shell: Wisdom
- Cross, anchor and Bible: Trials, victory and reward
- Crown: Reward and glory
- Dolphin: Salvation, bearer of souls to Heaven
- Dove: Purity, love and Holy Spirit
- Evergreen: Eternal life
- Garland: Victory over death
- Gourds: Deliverance from grief
- Hands: A relation or partnership (see Reference 3)
- Heart: Devotion
- Horseshoe: Protection against evil
- Hourglass: Time and its swift flight
- IHS: Stylized version of iota-eta-sigma, a Greek abbreviation of "Iesus Hominum Salvator" ("Jesus, savior of mankind"); alternatively treated as an initialism for "in Hoc Signo (Vinces)": "In this sign you shall conquer." Commonly indicates Roman Catholic faith, the latter especially Society of Jesus.
- Ivy: Faithfulness, memory, and undying friendship
- Lamb: Innocence, young age
- Lamp: Immortality
- Laurel: Victory, fame
- Lily: Purity and resurrection
- Lion: Strength, resurrection
- Mermaid: Dualism of Christ – fully God, fully man
- Oak: Strength
- Olive branch: Forgiveness, and peace
- Palms: Martyrdom, or victory over death
- Peacock: Eternal life
- Pillow: a deathbed, eternal sleep
- Poppy: Eternal sleep
- Rooster: Awakening, courage and vigilance
- Shell: Birth and resurrection
- Skeleton: Life's brevity
- Snake in a circle: Everlasting life in Heaven
- Square and Compasses: Freemasonry
- Star of David: Judaism
- Swallow: Motherhood
- Broken sword: Life cut short
- Crossed swords: Life lost in battle
- Torch: Eternal life if upturned, death if extinguished
- Tree trunk: The beauty of life
- Triangle: Truth, equality, or the trinity
- Tzedakah box (pushke): Righteousness, for it is written "...to do righteousness and justice" (Gen 18:19) and "the doing of righteousness and justice is preferable to the Lord than sacrificial offering" (Proverbs 21:3).
- Shattered urn: Old age, mourning if draped
- Weeping willow: Mourning, grief

Greek letters might also be used:

- $\Alpha \Omega$ (alpha and omega): The beginning and the end
- $\Chi \Rho$ (chi rho): The first letters spelling the name of Christ

== Safety ==
Over time a headstone may settle or its fixings weaken. After several instances where unstable stones have fallen in dangerous circumstances, some burial authorities "topple test" headstones by firm pressure to check for stability. They may then tape them off or flatten them.

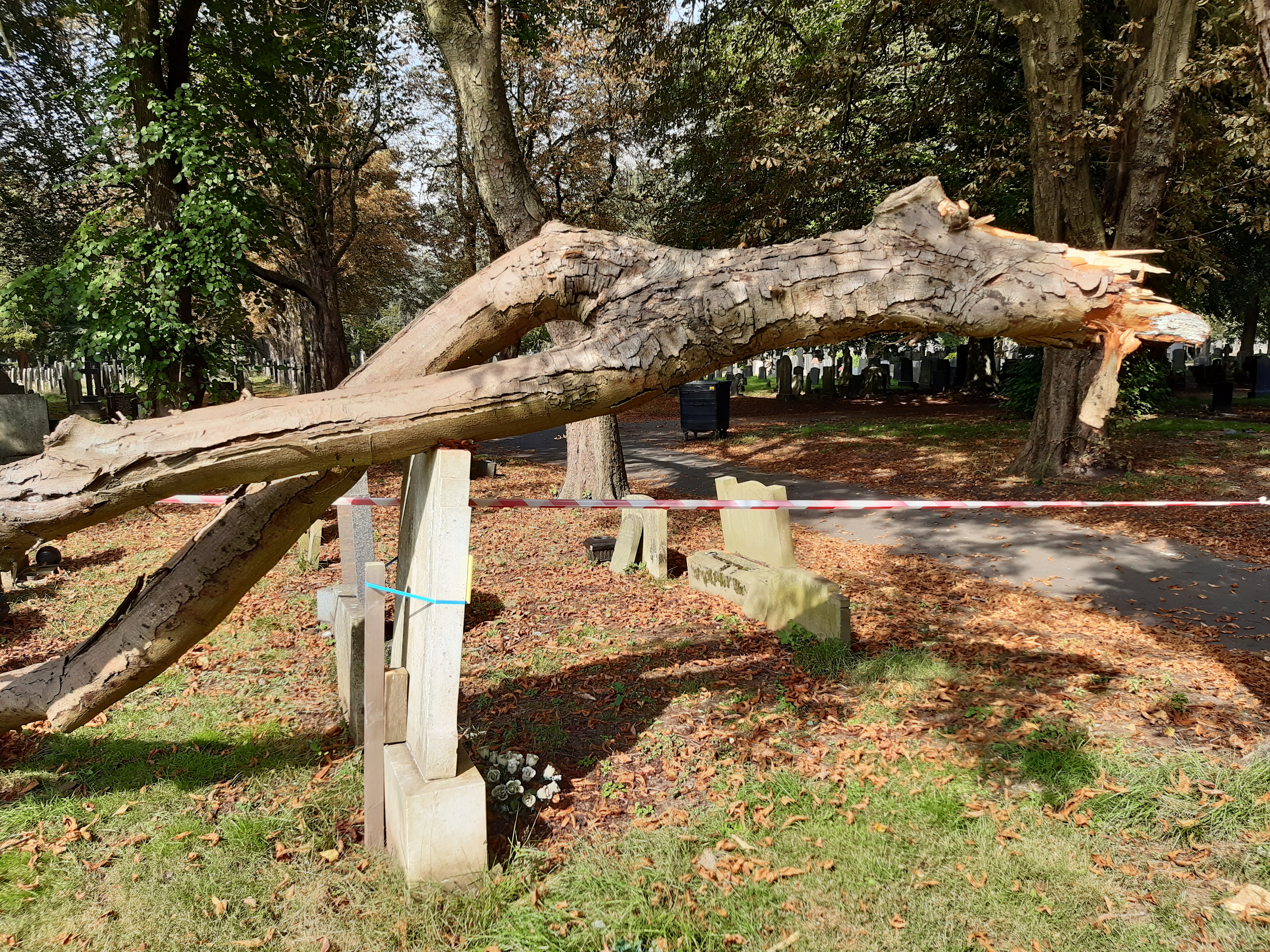
A gravestone is supported after being damaged by the bough of a tree in Southern Cemetery, Manchester

This procedure has proved controversial in the UK, where an authority's duty of care to protect visitors is complicated because it often does not have any ownership rights over the dangerous marker. Authorities that have knocked over stones during testing or have unilaterally lifted and laid flat any potentially hazardous stones have been criticised, after grieving relatives have discovered that their relative's marker has been moved. Since 2007 consistory court and local authority guidance now restricts the force used in a topple test and requires an authority to consult relatives before moving a stone. In addition, before laying a stone flat, it must be recorded for posterity.

== Gravestone cleaning ==
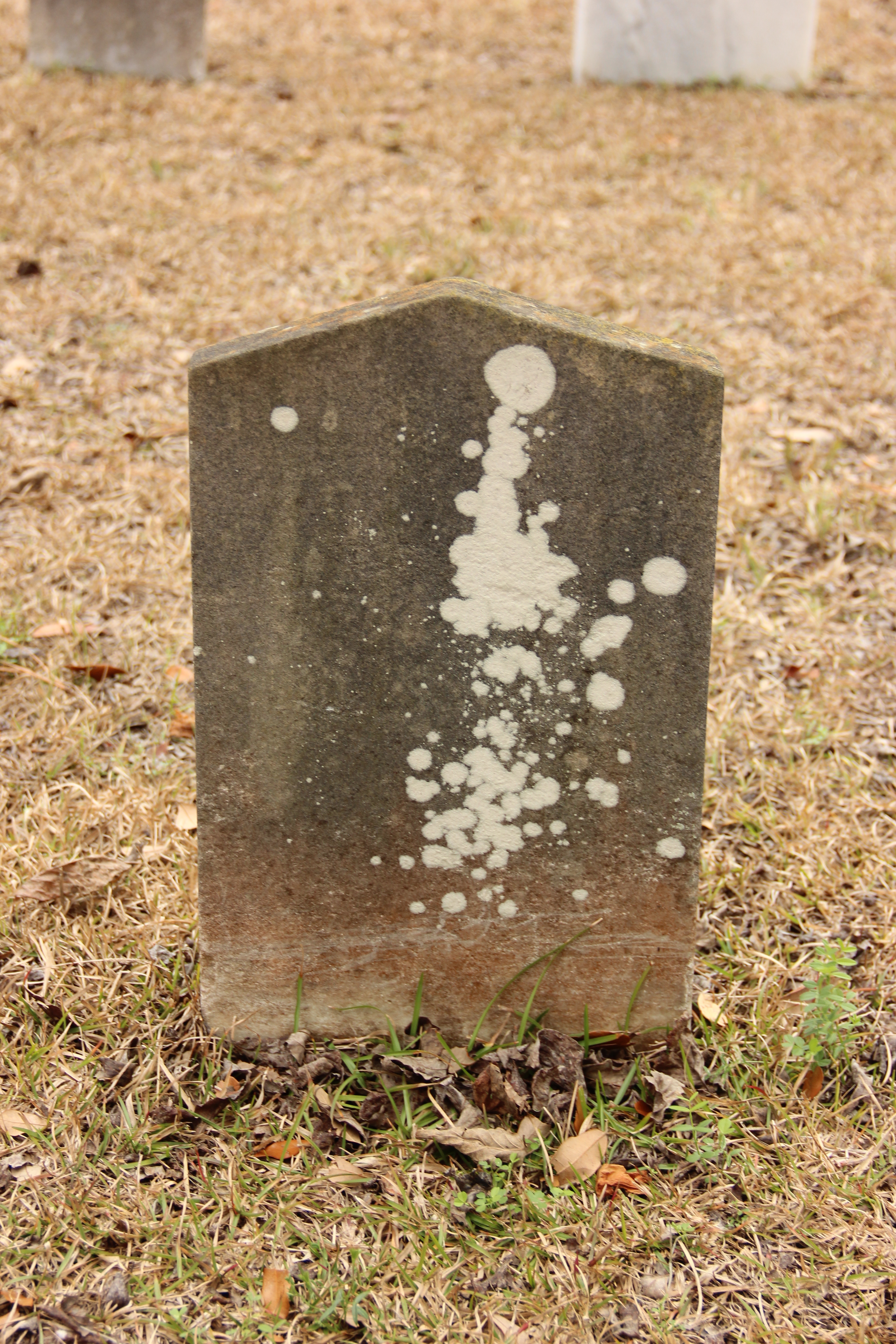
Gravestones are susceptible to natural wear over time, including lichen growth.

Gravestone cleaning can preserve gravestones and increase their lifespans. A gravestone can be cleaned to remove vandalism and graffiti, biological growth such as algae or lichen, and other minerals, soiling, or staining. However, repairs, especially if they are too aggressive, can also remove natural signs of age or cause additional damage.

In the United States, the National Park Service has published guidelines for gravestone cleaning, which recommend careful and deliberate work using soft brushes and gentle cleansers, no more than once a year. An organization that advocates for and undertakes cemetery restorations recommends seeking permission to clean the grave marker from a "descendant, the sexton, cemetery superintendent or the town, in that order."

== Image gallery ==
Typical late-20th-century headstone, Dubuque, Iowa

19th-century marble headstone, Saints Peter and Paul Catholic Church (Sherrill, Iowa)

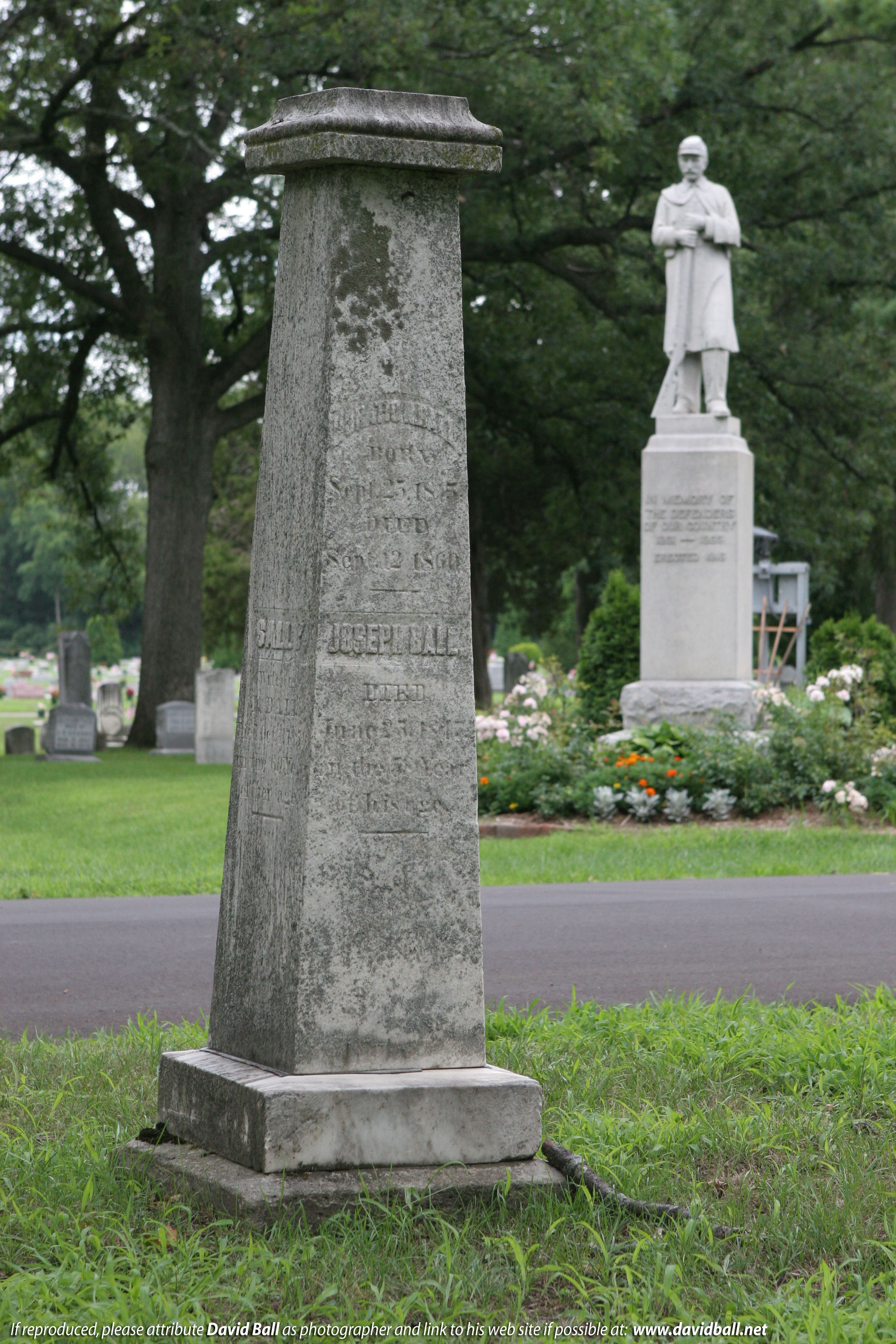
Grave marker for Horatio Nelson Ball and father, Joseph Ball Jr., Grandville Cemetery, MI, US

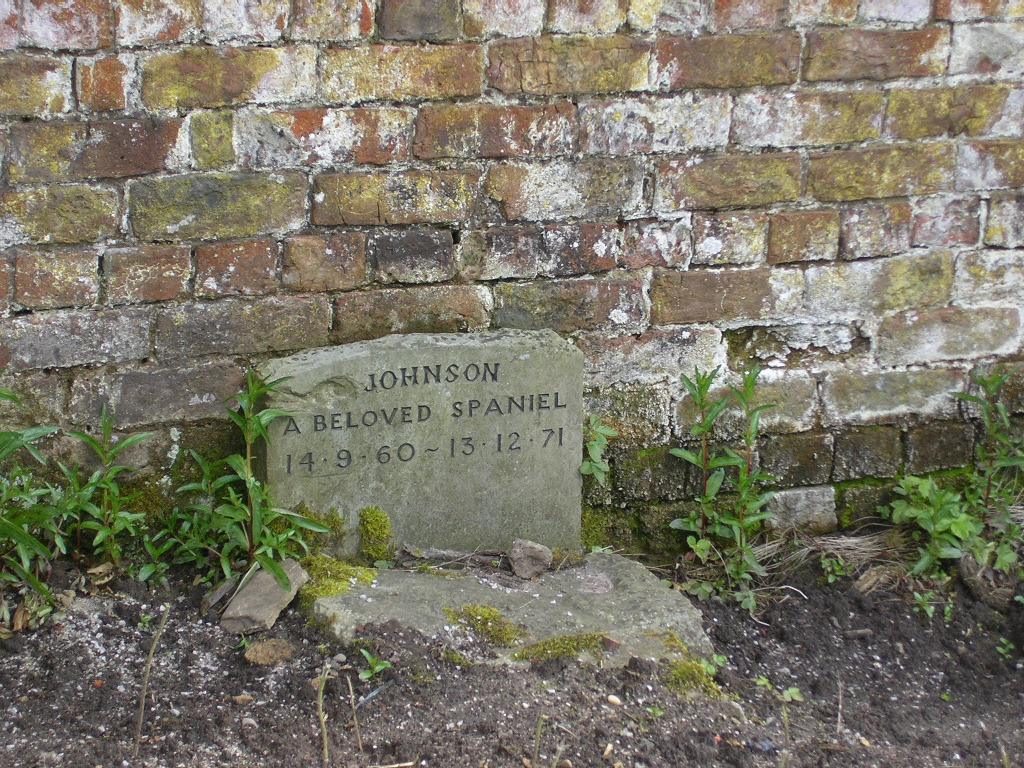
Headstone for a dog, Tatton Park, Cheshire, England

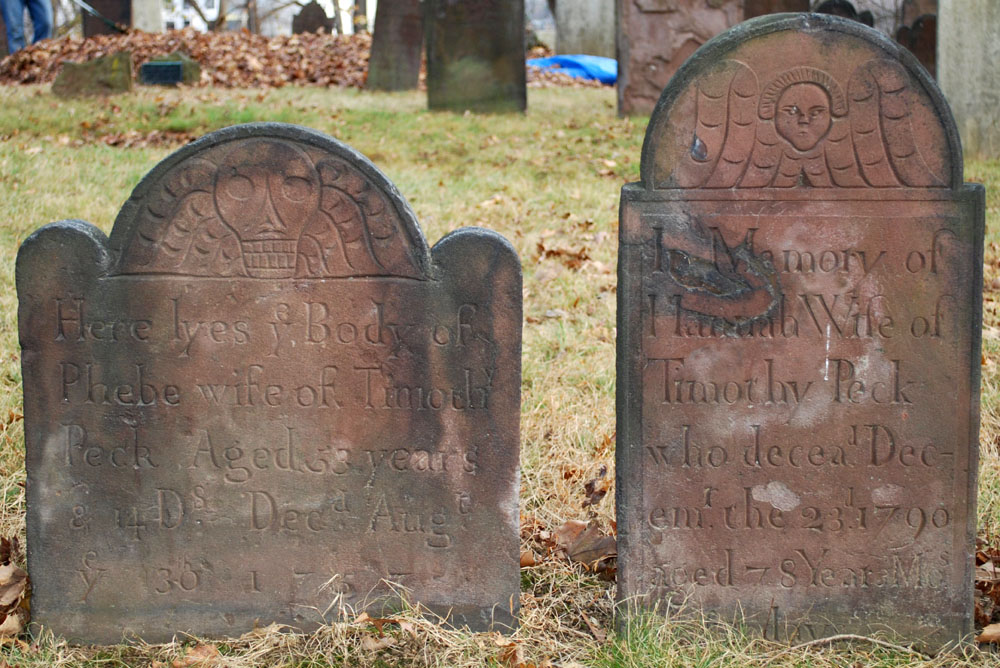
Winged skull & winged soul effigies, Morristown, NJ

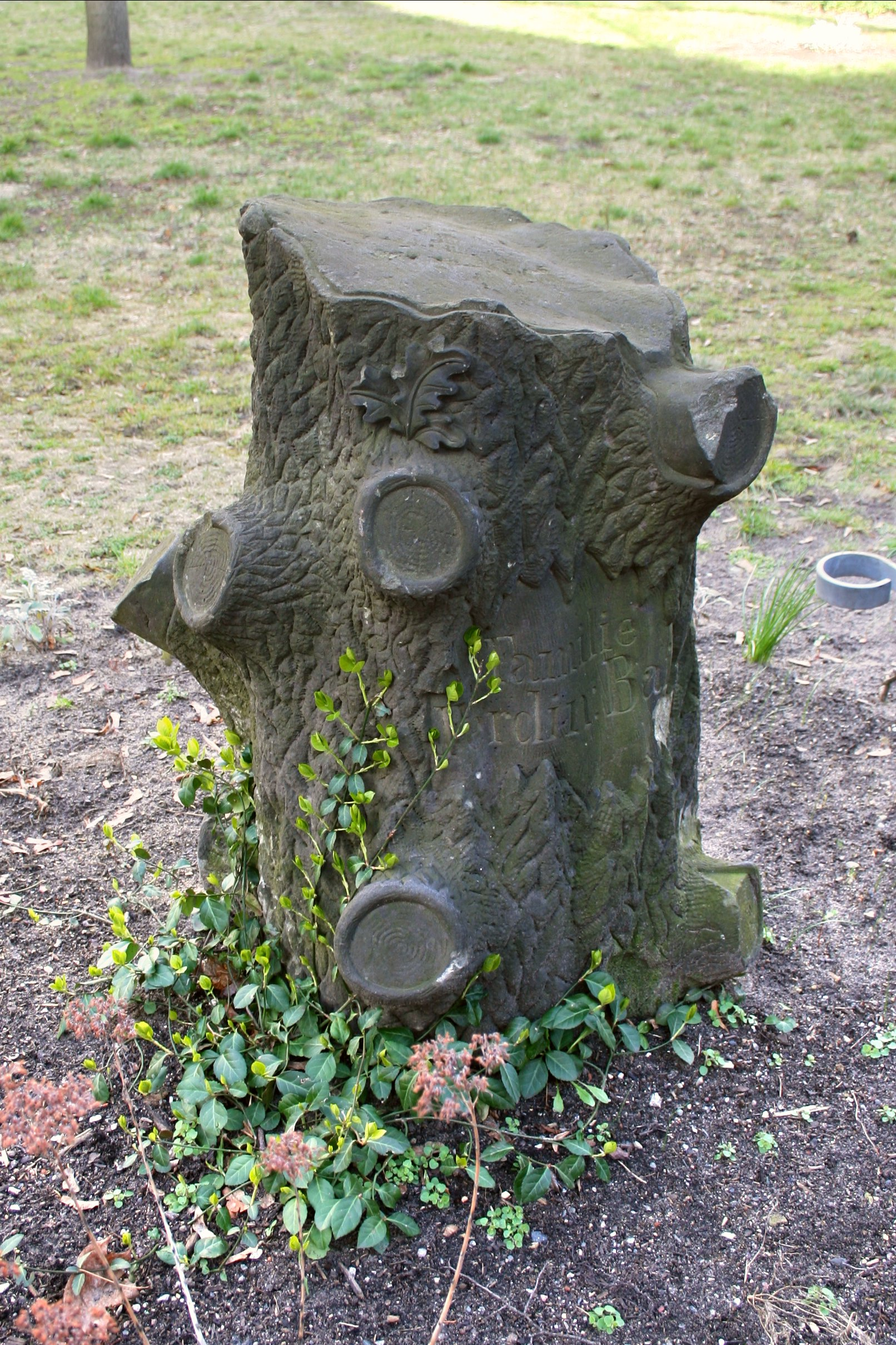
Unconventional tombstone in the Cemetery Park of the "Freireligiöse Gemeinde" in Berlin, Prenzlauer Berg. Tree stump headstones in U.S. cemeteries are often associated with fraternal organization Woodmen of the World.

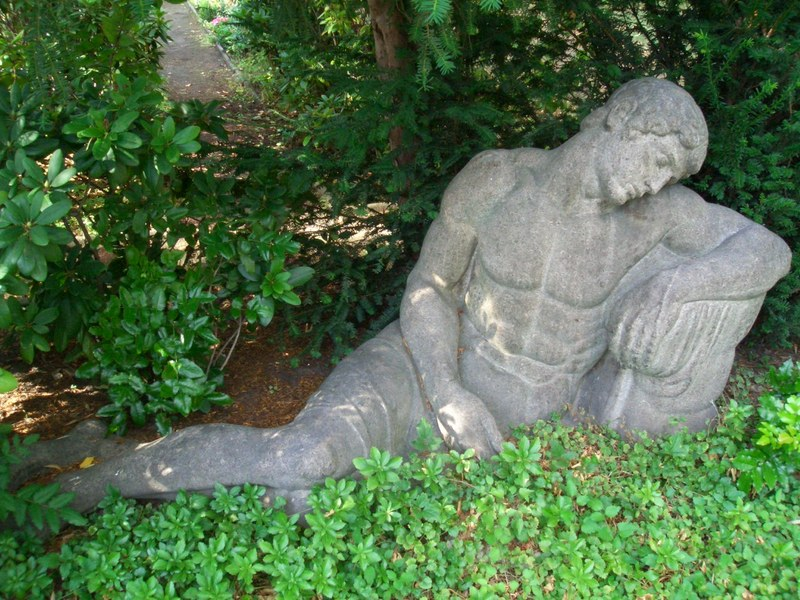
Der Schlaf (The Sleep), 1907, sculpture by Hermann Hosaeus at the I. Städtischer Friedhof Eisackstraße

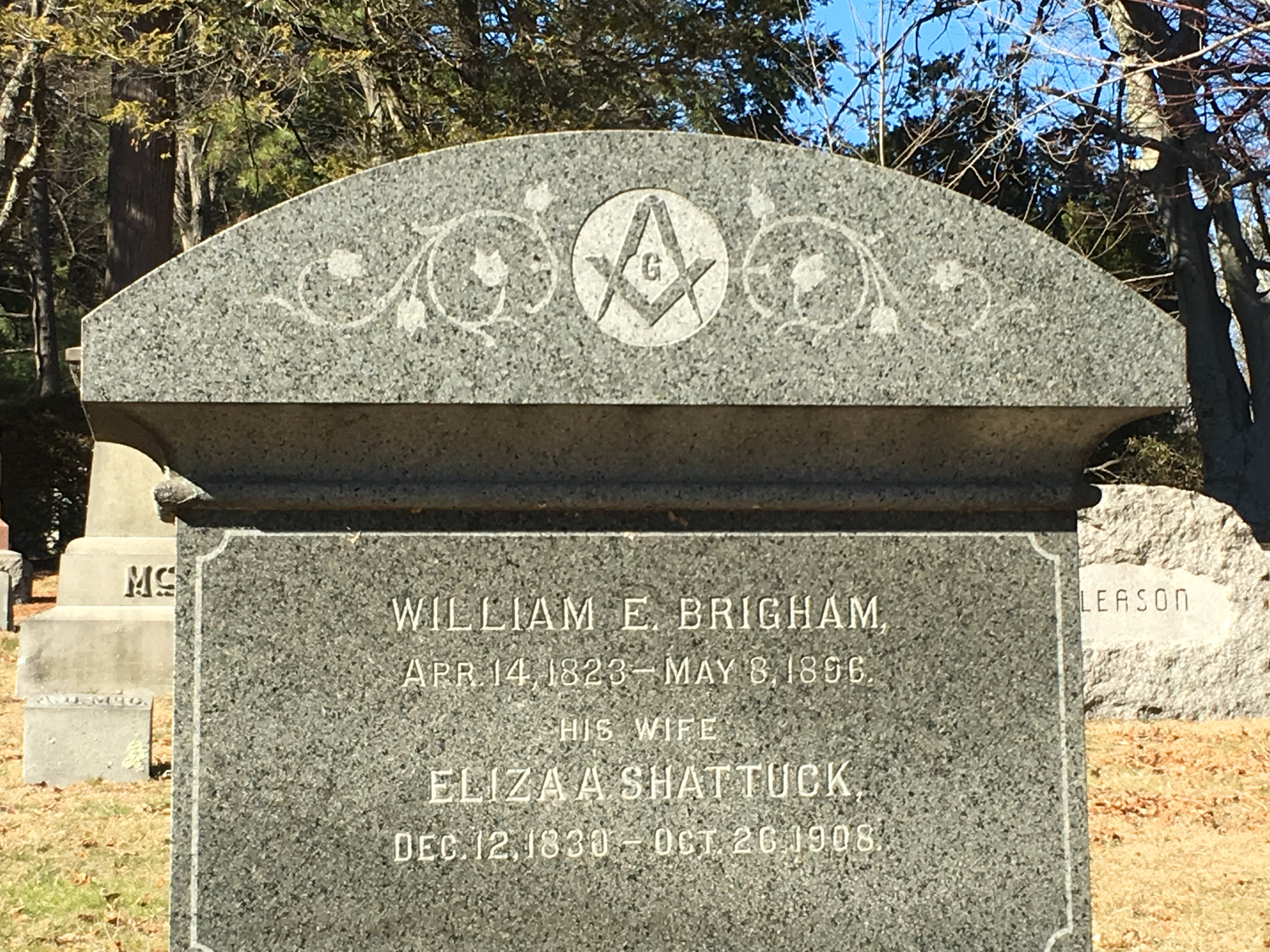
A late-19th-century headstone adorned with the Masonic square and compass

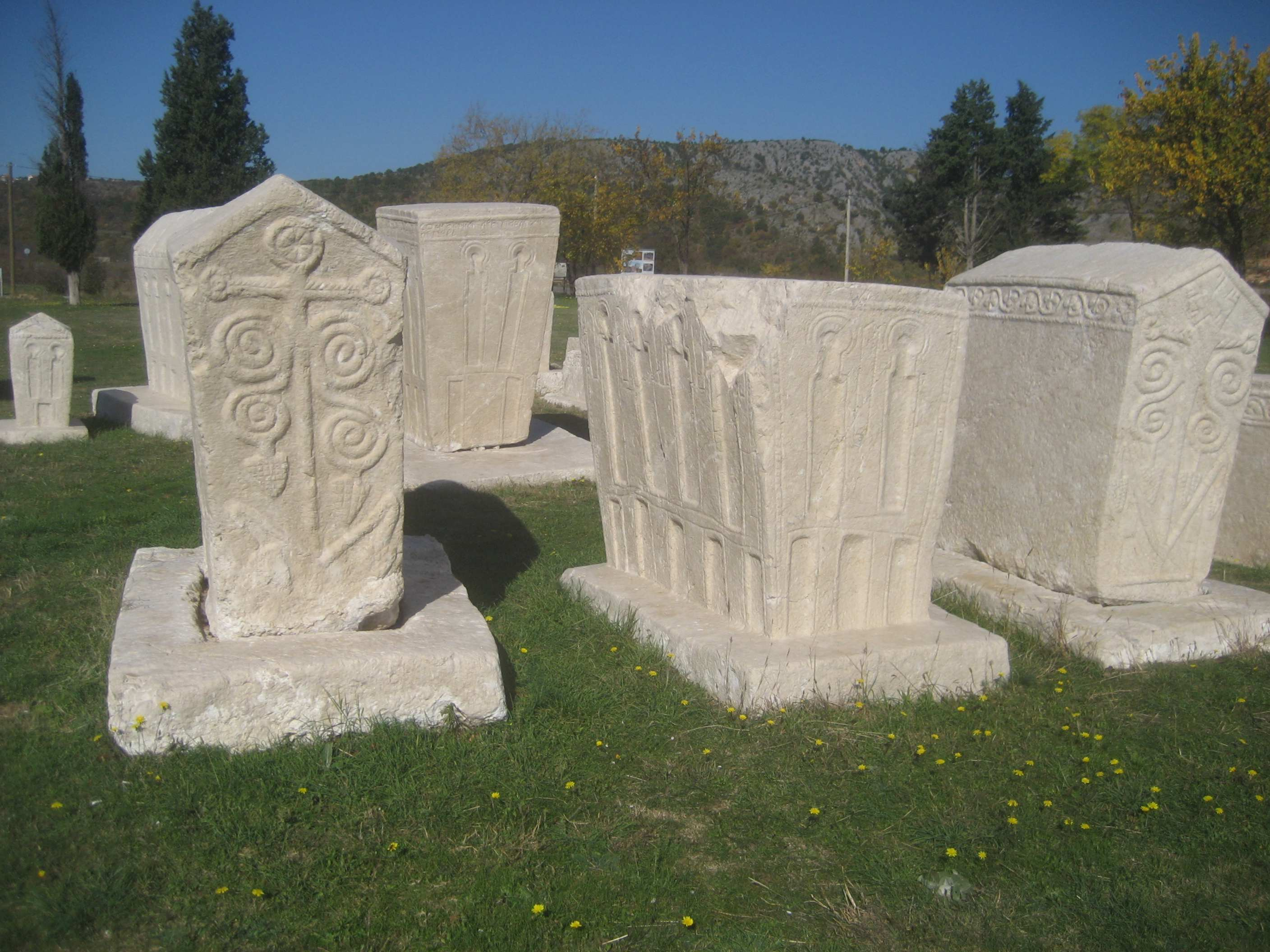
Stećak tombstones in Bosnia, burial practice of all religious communities until mid to late 16th century, probably spread through Vlach funerary practice

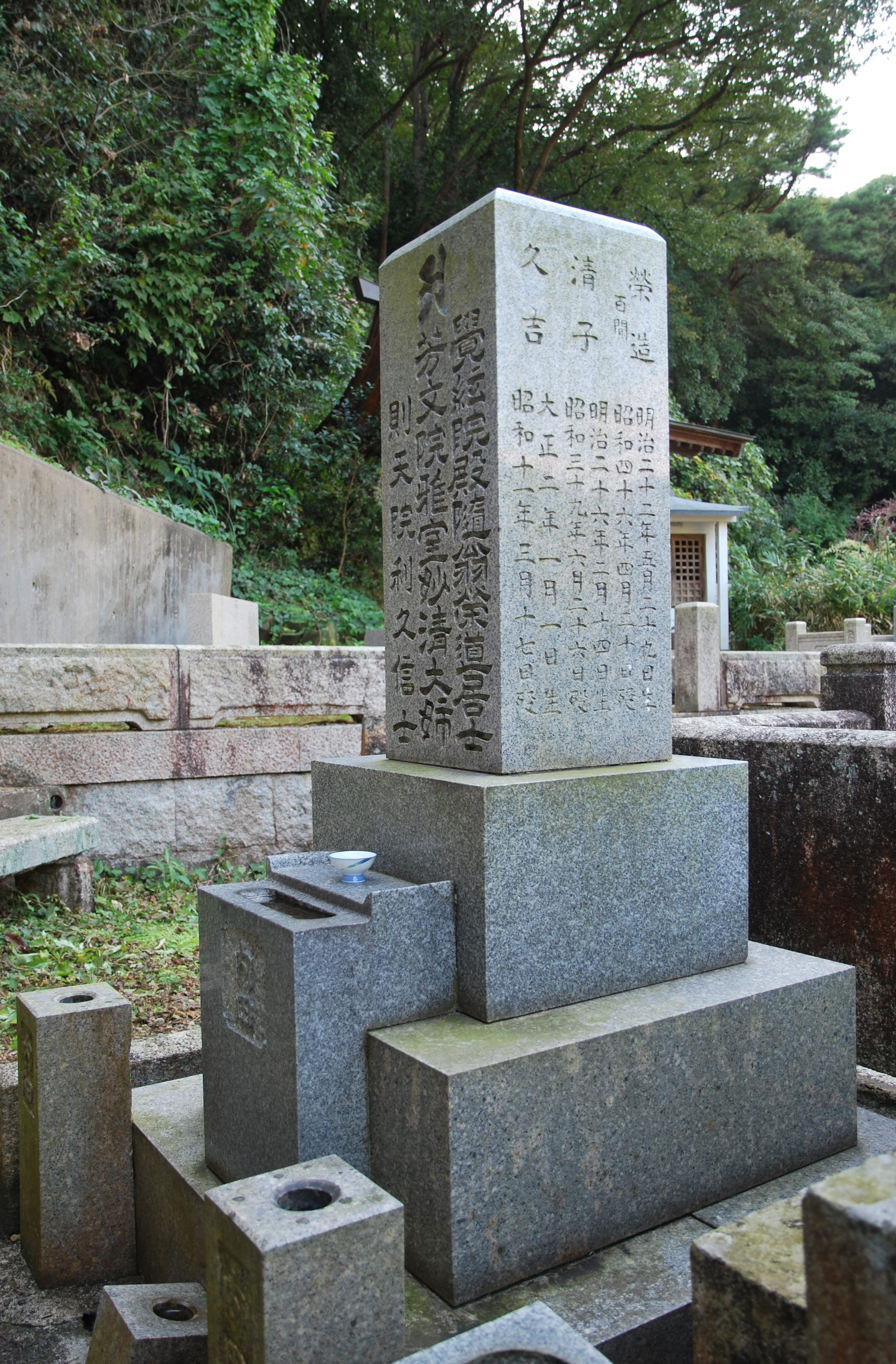
The grave of Uchida Hyakken in Okayama, Japan. The headstone is columnar, which is a particularly common configuration for headstones in Japan.

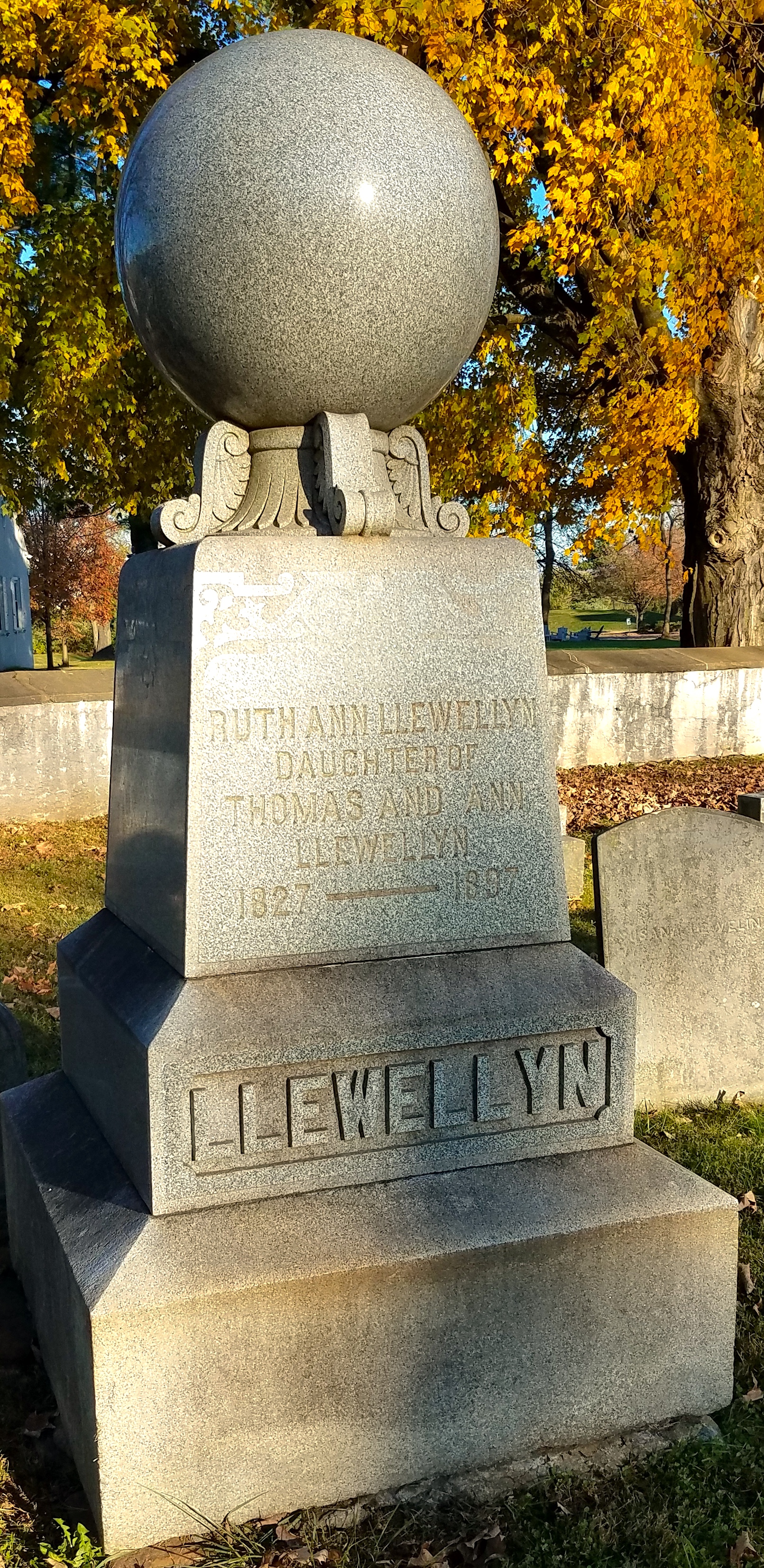
Tombstone topped with orb symbolizing a celestial body and the reward of resurrection, churchyard of St. Peter's Church in the Great Valley, Malvern, Chester County, Pennsylvania

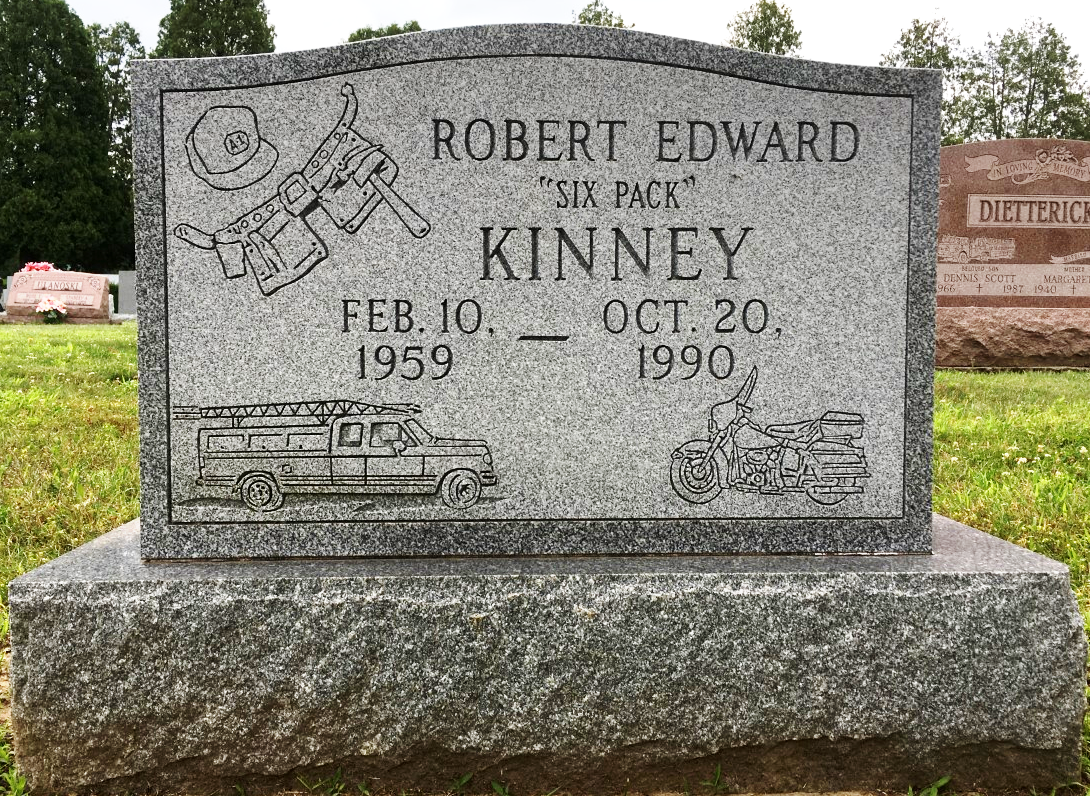
Personalized gravestone inscription, Berwick, PA

== See also ==
- Gravestone rubbing
- Khachkar
- Mausoleum
- Megalith
- Murder stone
- Sarcophagus
- Scottish gravestones
- The Devil's Chair (urban legend)
- Tombstone tourist
- Viewlogy
