= Viewlogy =

Electronic grave information system

The Viewlogy–Electronic Biographical Gravestone was a computerized memorial that could be installed into a gravestone or a cremation urn. It was released in 1997.

Designed by Leif Technology Inc, the Viewlogy consisted of a dedicated biographical computer that stored the life story and photographs of the deceased in digital format burned permanently into the ROM of the custom designed computer. Up to 200 pages of information could be stored and displayed on the LCD screen. People would submit life stories and photographs which would then be recorded in the computer's memory.

The unit was locked into a weatherproof stainless steel case with a lexan protective screen which was then placed into a gravestone. Versions of Viewlogy were also adapted for cremation urns and flush-to-ground bronze markers. The device was powered by a replaceable battery with ten years of expected life. A solar powered model was also planned. The cost of the device (and the cost to generate the biographical information) proved too high at the time for full production.
