= Alberto Airola =

Italian politician

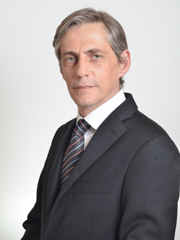

Member of the Senate of the Republic
- In office 15 March 2013 – 12 October 2022

Leader of the 5 Star Movement in the Senate
- In office 16 October 2014 – 15 January 2015

Personal details
- Born: 6 July 1970 (age 55) Moncalieri, Piedmont, Italy
- Party: Five Star Movement

Alberto Airola (born 13 May 1970) is an Italian politician for the Five Star Movement.

== Early life ==
Airola was born in Moncalieri, south of Turin in Piedmont.

== Political career ==
Airola was elected to the Italian Senate in the 2013 general election. Airola became new leader of the 5 Star Movement in the Senate on 15 October 2014, taking over from Vito Rosario Petrocelli.

After the 2017 Turin stampede in the Piazza San Carlo, Airola disputed the estimate of the number of injuries caused by the crowd, claiming to be false figures disseminated in order to attack the mayor Chiara Appendino.

Airola has been a critic of Matteo Salvini.

== Personal life ==
On the night of 3 September 2017, Airola was attacked and robbed by two North African drug dealers in Turin. Following the struggle with the criminals he suffered a double jaw fracture.

On August 16, 2018 he attempted suicide in his bathroom at home in the Borgo Aurora neighborhood in Turin, but was saved by his sister who called 118. He has since recovered from the incident, thanking his sister for saving his life.

== See also ==
- List of current Italian senators
