= Turin Massacre (1864) =

Massacre in Turin

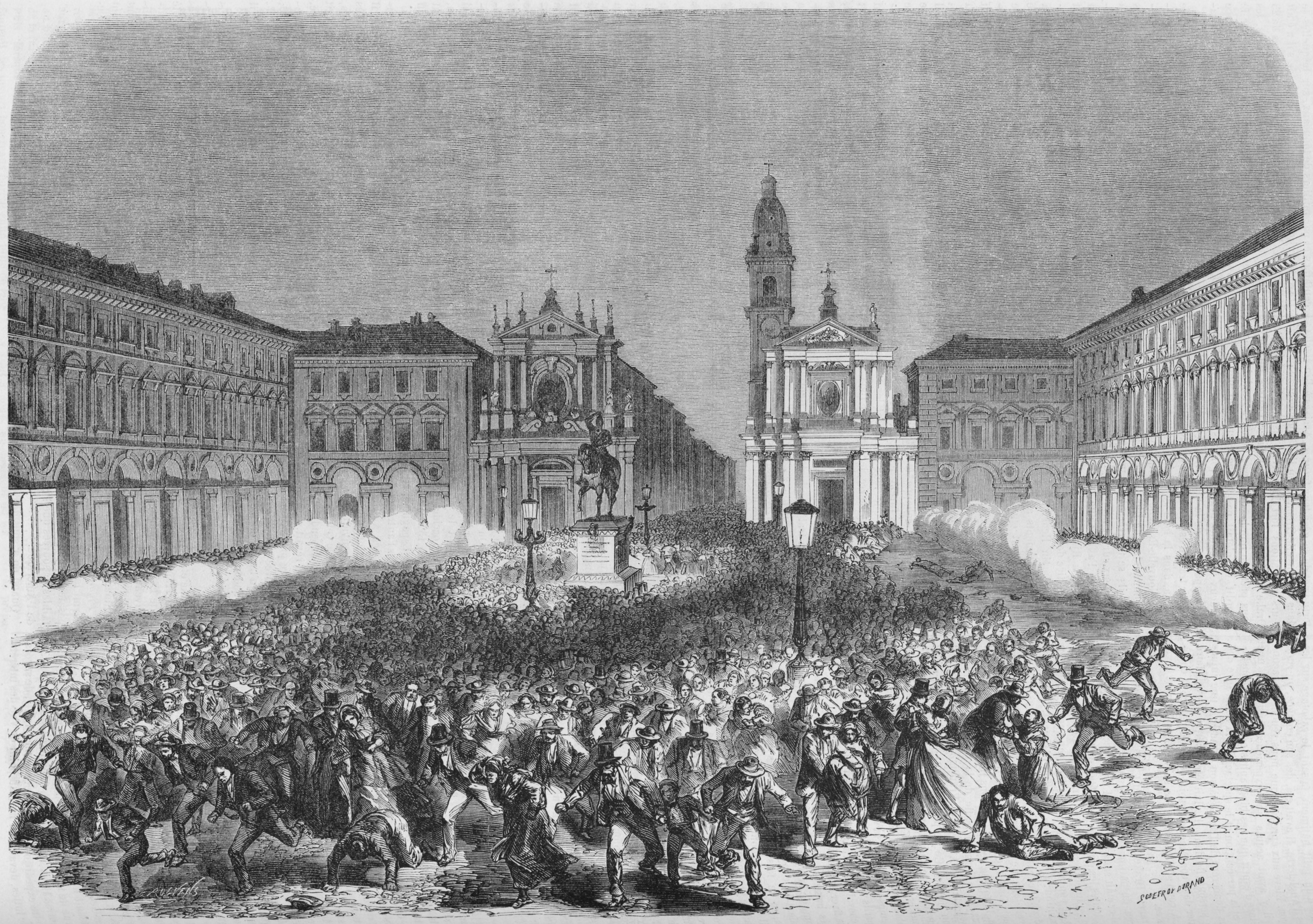
- Location: Piazza Castello and Piazza San Carlo, Turin, Italy
- Date: September 21, 1864 September 22, 1864
- Deaths: 62
- Injuries: 138
- Perpetrators: Carabinieri, Royal Italian Army
- Motive: Repression of protests against the relocation of the capital

The Turin Massacre was a massacre carried out by members of the Royal Italian Army (mainly Carabinieri cadets) on 21 and 22 September 1864 against groups of civilian demonstrators. The clashes occurred during popular protests against the transfer of the capital of the Kingdom of Italy from the Piedmontese city to Florence.

On the morning of 21 September 1864, clashes occurred in Piazza San Carlo between demonstrators and law enforcement. In the afternoon, a separate crowd armed with sticks moved toward the headquarters of the Ministry of the Interior in Piazza Castello. There, a contingent of carabinieri cadets, defending the building, fired on the demonstrators, causing 15 casualties. On the evening of 22 September, carabinieri cadets fired on the crowd in Piazza San Carlo, striking an infantry battalion that was crossing the square. The battalion returned fire, creating a three-way crossfire between the carabinieri, the infantry, and the civilian crowd. 47 military and civilian personnel were killed in the crossfire.

The events caused the fall of the Minghetti government as well as several official inquiries by parliamentary commissions; however, all those arrested were subject to a general amnesty in February 1865.

== Background: the relocation of the capital city ==
In June 1864, taking advantage of rumors about the health of Pope Pius IX and possible uprisings in the Papal States, prime minister Marco Minghetti sent Gioacchino Napoleone Pepoli to the Italian ambassador in Paris, Costantino Nigra, with arrangements to negotiate the withdrawal of French troops from the Holy See's territories. To reach the agreement, Emperor Napoleon III required a guarantee showing the renunciation of the conquest of Rome, which had been indicated since 1861 by the Italian government as the ideal capital of the kingdom; Pepoli asked if moving the Italian capital from Turin to another city, something already assumed by the government, could provide adequate guarantee; the emperor confirmed that he would certainly sign the agreement with that condition. Victor Emmanuel II was informed in August, upon Pepoli's return.

The King received the transport clause, not only with revulsion, but also with sorrow. He had many talks with Minghetti and Pepoli. He seemed for a few moments somewhat shaken, and then took time to think about it during an absence from Turin.

— Letter from Minister Emilio Visconti Venosta to Ambassador Nigra

On 11 September 1864 Minghetti informed Minister Menabrea that the king accepted the treaty, moving the capital to Florence for purely strategic reasons.

The convention was then officially signed on 15 September 1864. At the request of Victor Emmanuel II, the binding protocol to move the seat of government was kept separate and secret within six months of the signing to prevent it from appearing "the result of pressure from a foreign government."

== Dissemination of the news in Turin ==
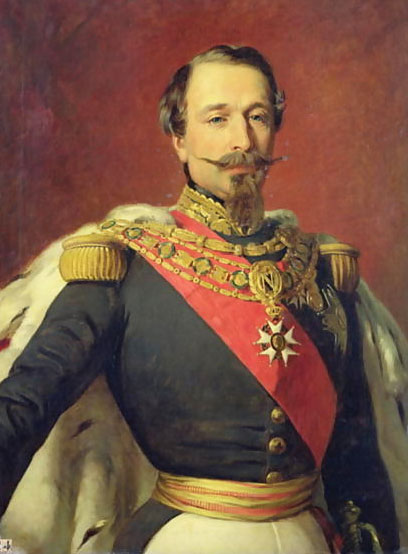
Napoleon III

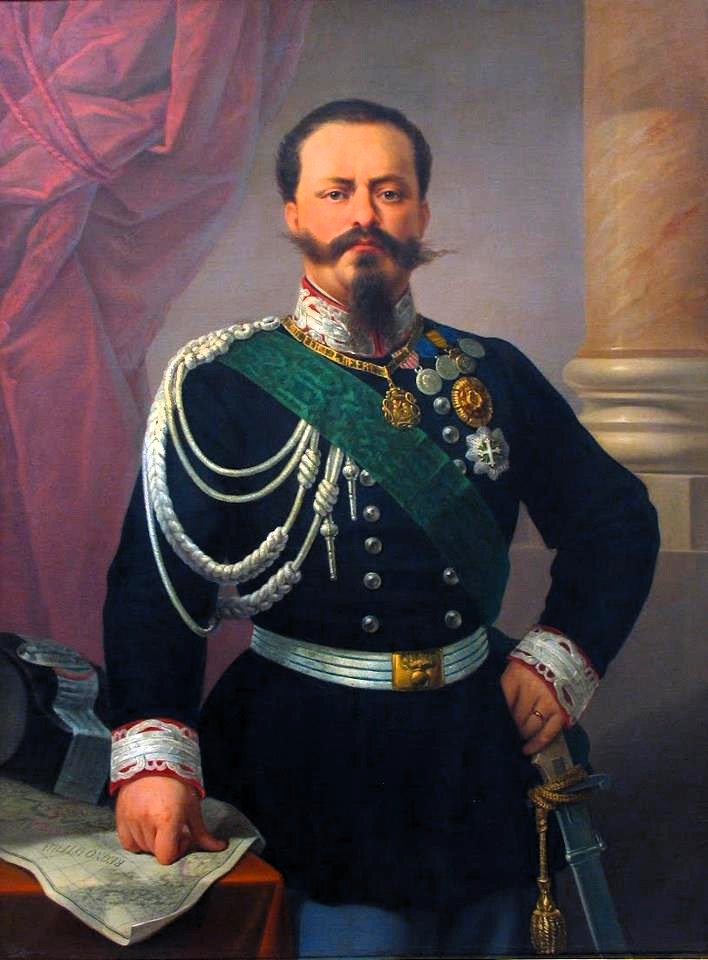
Victor Emmanuel II

Despite ministerial secrecy, details of the agreement began to circulate as early as August 26 of that year. Turin newspapers, linked to political factions, took different positions on the agreement. The Minghetti government could count on Gazzetta ufficiale, the voice of the ministry, and on L'Opinione, directed by Giacomo Dina; it was also supported by La Stampa (different from the later newspaper of the same name), directed by Paulo Fambri and linked to Ubaldino Peruzzi and Silvio Spaventa, and the Gazzetta di Torino, linked to Luigi Menabrea. Then there were Senator Carlo Alfieri's Discussione, Monarchia nazionale linked to Urbano Rattazzi and the center-left, and Il Diritto linked to the left-wing. The anticlerical Gazzetta del popolo was headed by Giovan Battista Bottero.

On 16 September, the day after the signing, L'Opinione published the agreement, with no mention of the secret protocol; on 18 September Gazzetta del popolo reported the erroneous rumor (which had spread the previous day) that the condition imposed by the French side was the relocation of the capital to Florence. The dissemination of fragmentary news then led to speculation and accusations against the government; there were even rumors of ceding Piedmontese territory to France.

On 20 September a demonstration was held in the streets of the city with shouts against the relocation of the capital ("Down with the ministry!, Rome or Turin!, Down with the agreement!, Long live Garibaldi!") and with the participation of a large number of people (five or six thousand according to some sources). The relocation of the capital was seen by many as a threat to the economic development of the city, as can be seen below:

"In the midst of all these considerations, there also flashed through the minds of the affluent citizens the thought of a thousand offended interests, and of the grave conditions that transportation prepared for the city of Turin, which had so eagerly engaged in works, speculations and industries that perhaps could hardly prosper if its seat of Government were abruptly removed."

In addition, about 100 people gathered in Piazza Castello to protest with whistles against the headquarters of the Gazzetta di Torino, leaving after a short time without incident. The paper that day had published an article (Note: The article is fully reproduced in Rossi & Gabotto 1915, pp. 21–22) which, although in favor of the agreement, was supposed to pacify the people of Turin; it was "sent by the Court to the paper at the desire of the king himself, who was quite mistaken as to the effect it would produce, and to which none of the courtiers had the good sense to advise against its publication. (Note: In 1884 the article was attributed to the king himself. Cf. V.L., Vittorio Emanuele giornalista, in Corriere della Sera, January 9, 1884.)

The article was in fact compiled, but so poorly that it had the opposite effect, although it interpreted itself far worse than it deserved, thus becoming an incidental cause of the painful events that followed.

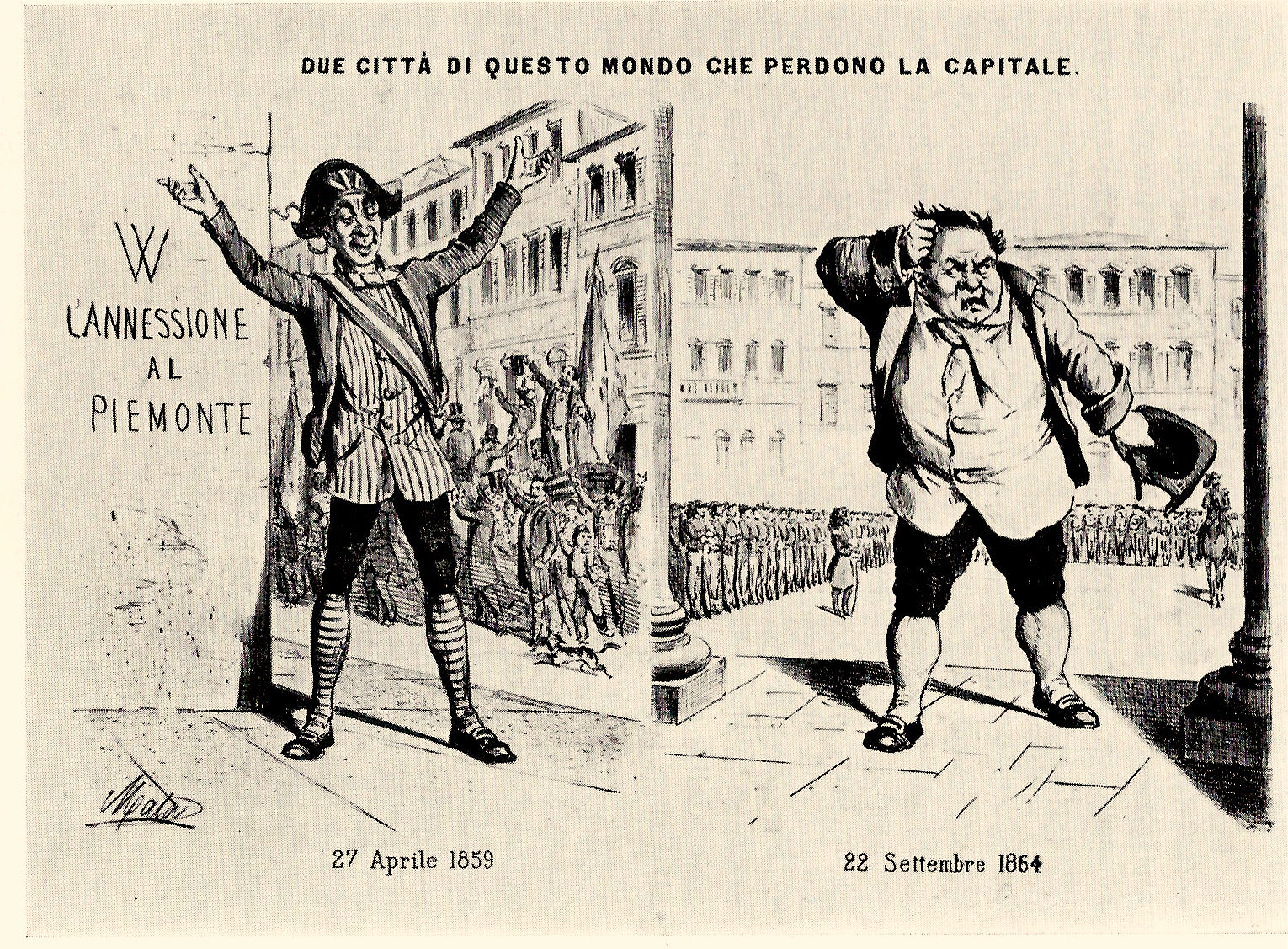
Adolfo Matarelli, Two cities of this world that lose their capital ("Il Lampione," 1864)

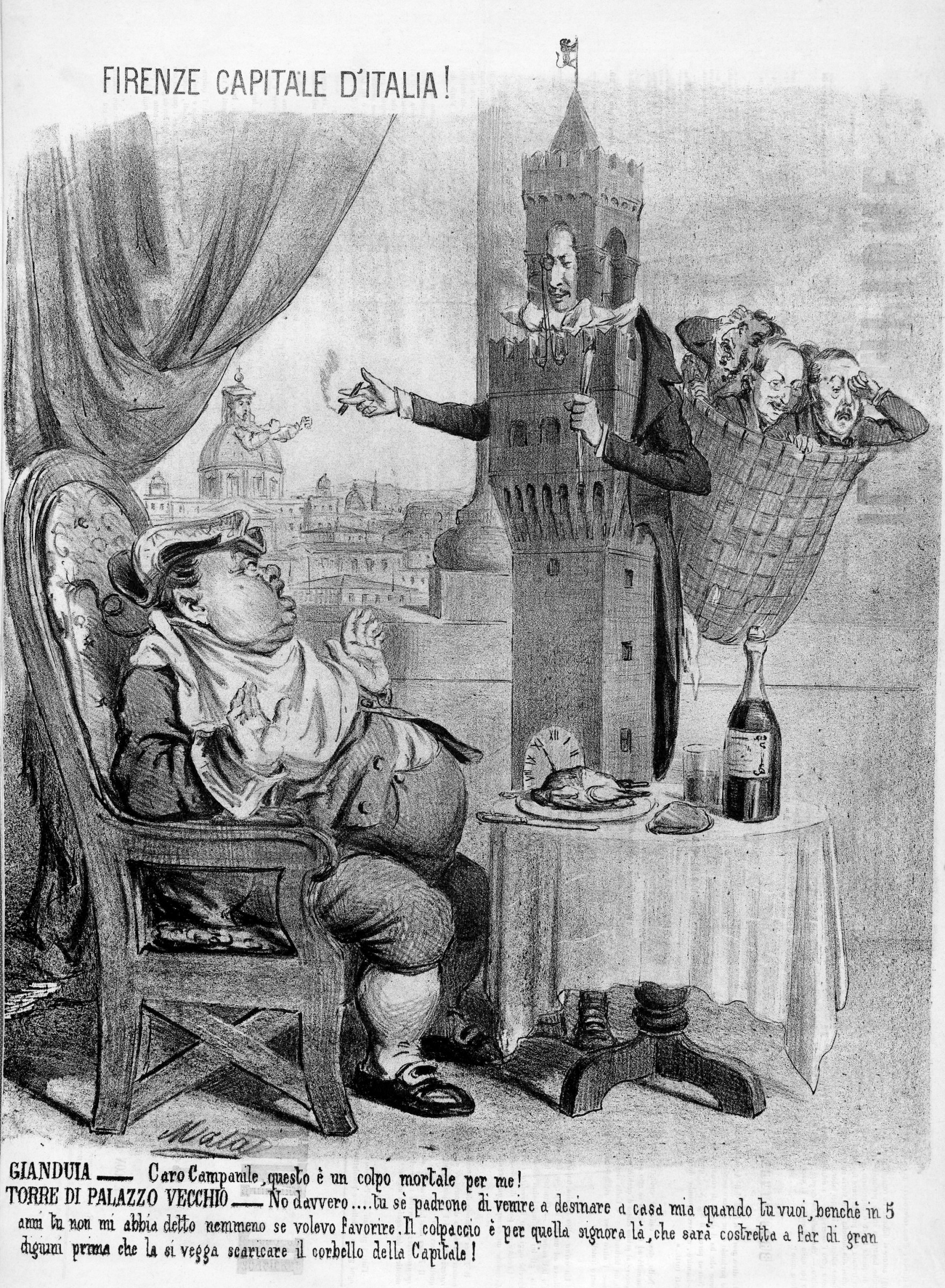
Adolfo Matarelli, Florence Capital of Italy (Il Lampione, Sept. 24, 1864)

== Events ==
=== 21 September ===
The afternoon

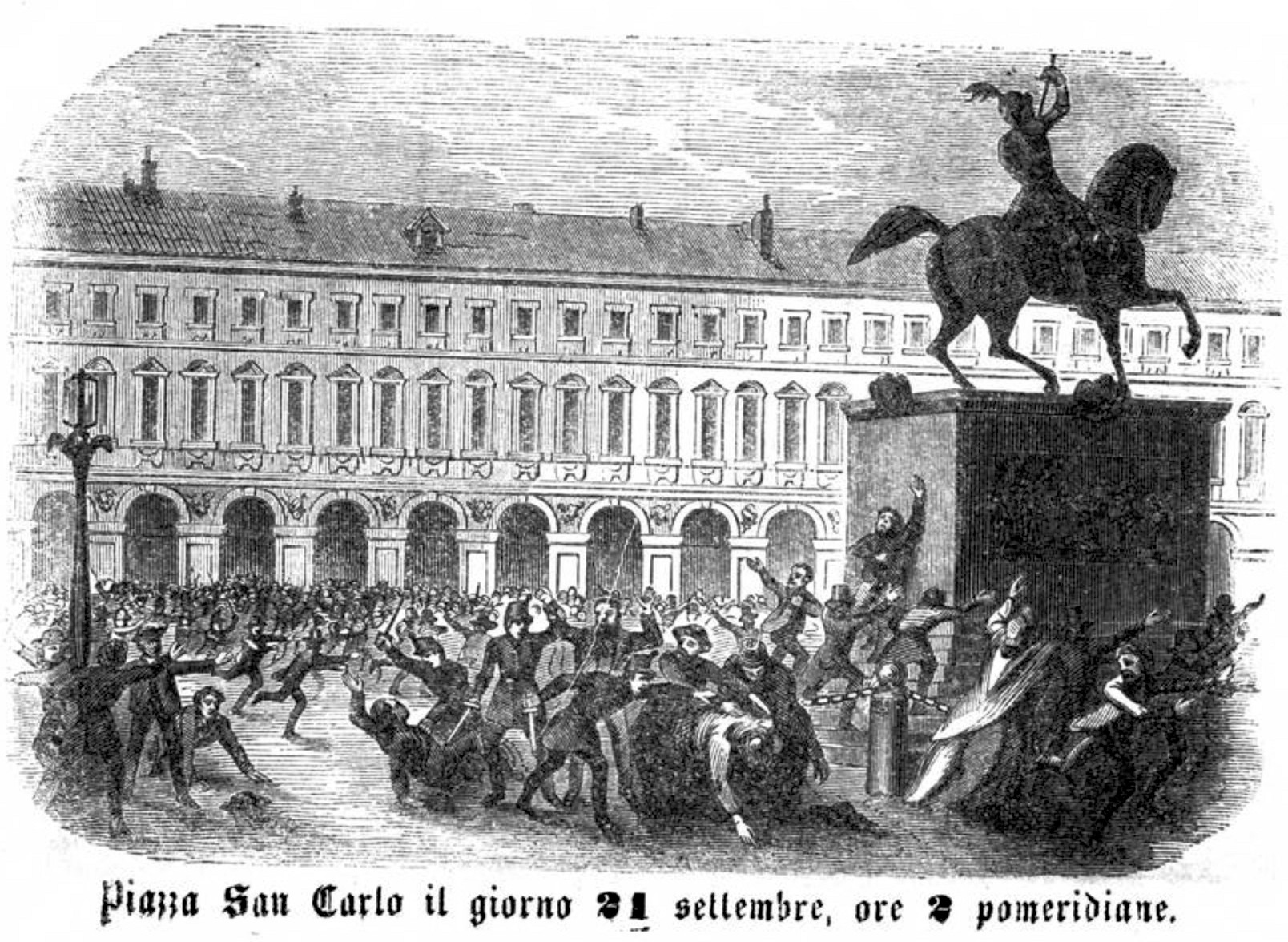
Piazza San Carlo, day 21, 2 p.m.

The extraordinary city council was scheduled for 2 pm. to discuss the relocation of the capital. Various people gathered under the windows to get news; protests also occurred and copies of the Gazzetta di Torino were burned.

In the lack of news from the ongoing city council, people quickly dispersed, while a small group of young people headed to Piazza San Carlo to the printing press of the Gazzetta di Torino with some Italian flags. The owner went to the police headquarters to request help, while others prevented the group from entering. Orders then came from the police headquarters to disperse the gatherings, seize the flags and arrest those carrying them. Numerous public security guards (mainly cadets) rushed to the scene and unsheathed their daggers against the gathering of people, who, taken by surprise, responded with stones; the guards then chased and beat the people outside the square as well, striking and throwing bystanders and passers-by to the ground and even those who were in charge of defending the printing press.

Attracted by some shouts we all looked out of the window, and saw about a hundred or so people quite scattered, gathered around a man carrying a flag. We heard confused shouts, among which I distinguished something against the Turin Gazette. The hundred or so people, whom we could see under our window, were manifestly looking at something that was going on under the porch; but except for a very few who from time to time uttered shouts, there was nothing threatening about their demeanor.

All of a sudden we saw a column of public security guards coming out of the police headquarters, led by an officer, who could not have been less than sixty. The column marched at a brisk pace without uttering a word and without the people against whom they were coming moving away; and in the act the officer grabbed the flag to snatch it out of the hands of those holding it, shouting something unintelligible, which for the aftermath we thought was an order to take up arms and use them; all of a sudden, the guards, having unsheathed their daggers, started to slash that group of people standing on the square – mind you, on the square and not under the porch – running after those who were trying to save themselves by fleeing, and hitting them mercilessly.

We then saw scenes that would make one shudder, among them isolated men beaten and dragged by four or five guards.

— Testimony of Mattia Montecchi

Twenty-nine people were taken to the police station, including some injured; a new group began to form in front of the building, and the guards came out again with daggers in their fists, but were stopped by their superiors. The group outside, which had become large, demanded the release of those arrested, considering the guards' action disproportionate; stones were also thrown at the windows.

The police headquarters was now besieged, and a delegation from the city council arrived (Rignon, Pateri Corsi, Moris and Villa) who, failing to calm the crowd, advised the police commissioner to release the arrested (the return of the flags was also requested). A pacification of the square was thus achieved.

Evening

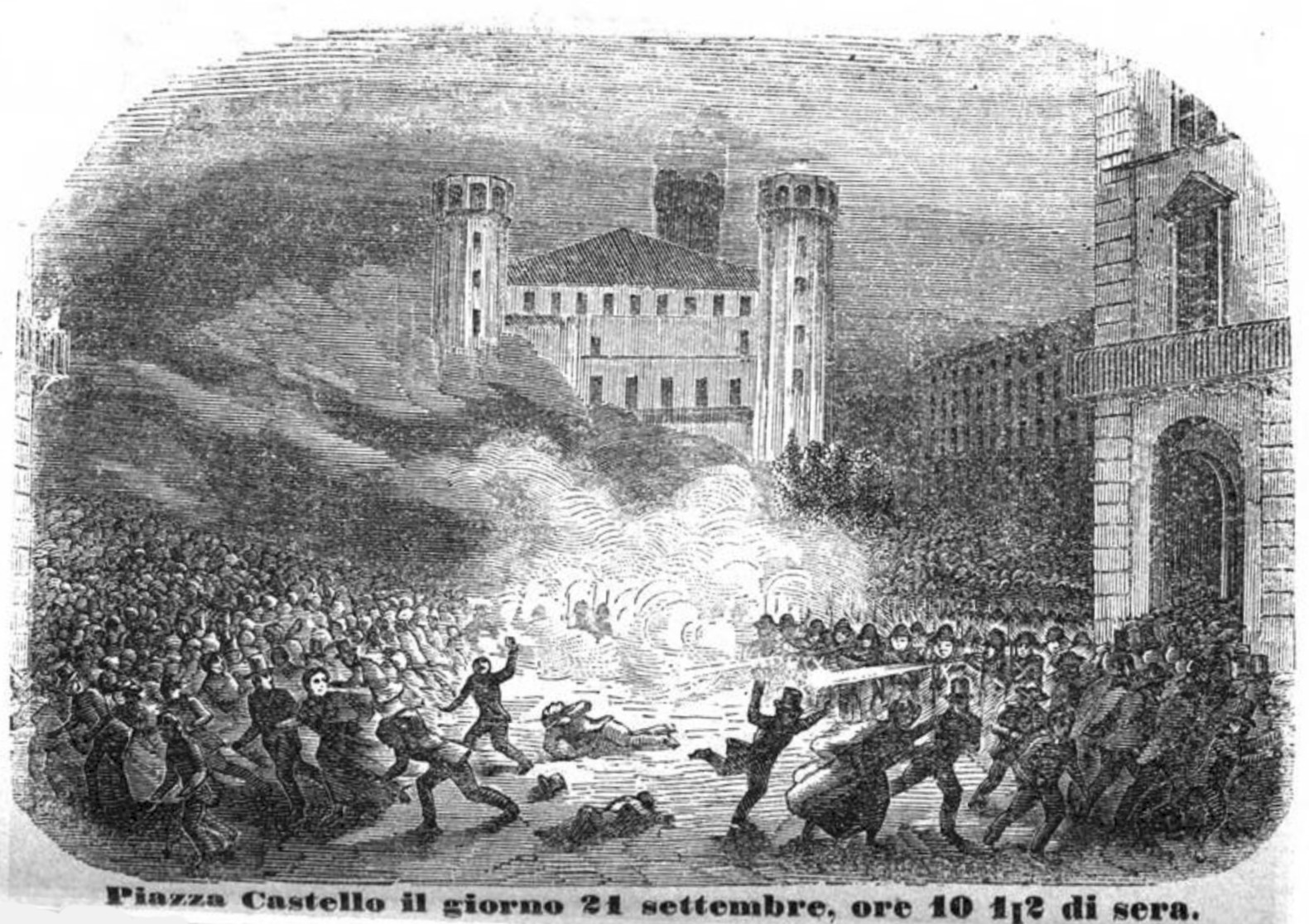
Piazza Castello on 21 September at 10:30 pm

Several gatherings of people formed in the city starting at 5 pm, first under the city hall and then under the mayor's residence; the latter on both occasions tried to persuade the protesters to respect the law.

A crowd had gathered in Piazza San Carlo to protest against the Turin Gazette and the police headquarters. Carabinieri cadets, armed with loaded rifles, were stationed in the square, followed by numerous troops (bersaglieri, cavalry and infantry) while the National Guard rode through the adjacent streets; the aim was to keep the square clear and disperse the gatherings. Despite some provocations against the soldiers by throwing stones, the crowd began to thin out.

Two squads (one of carabinieri cadets) were arranged in Piazza Castello, dispersing a first group directed against the headquarters of the Ministry of the Interior. Another group of demonstrators, armed with sticks, entered the square and headed for the ministry toward the carabinieri cadets; after a brief uproar, two gunshots were heard, followed by a line of fire aimed at the population. After an initial moment of surprise, the square emptied leaving only dead and injured people.

I was standing near the drummer and proceeded towards the porches, where the confectioner Anselmo was, and there the Carabinieri cadets were lined up, I approached them with the intention that they would open their ranks as the line troops had done in the Via Nuova, but instead the Carabinieri closed their ranks and pinned their bayonets on us, especially against the tricolor flag that had been presented precisely to open the ranks to make a demonstration under the Ministry. An officer signaled for the soldiers to raise their rifles, but at that instant a rifle shot went off from the extreme left point, and I escaped hearing other subsequent shots discharged by the Carabinieri in different directions also against the fleeing men.

— Testimony of Carlo Muttis

Rescue efforts began; a gathering also formed, throwing stones at the carabinieri, who then retreated toward the Ministry headquarters.

During the night the bersaglieri arrested eight people who had taken weapons from a gunsmith's store.

=== 22 September ===
Reactions to the events of the previous evening

An exchange of communications took place between Victor Emmanuel II and Marco Minghetti the morning after the first massacre.

The sad events that have happened grieve me. You know that I foresaw them. I make the Ministry responsible for restoring order. Publish a state of siege if necessary. Bring in troops until there are enough. I do not want to witness such painful things. I will go to Turin as soon as order is restored.

— Victor Emmanuel II to Marco Minghetti, September 22, 8:30 am.

So far no disturbances: however, there is much talk of disturbances for this evening. General Della Rocca has made all the arrangements. We know that the action party is trying to take over the movement.

— Marco Minghetti to Victor Emmanuel II, 22 September

If I still do not come this evening to Turin, it is because I wish the trouble to end and I would not like to be an eyewitness to the blood shed in the country that I was born in. [...] It would be necessary to arrange with the Mayor a deputation to come to Turin and apologize to me, and to recommend some favorable changes that would calm and please the citizens misled by excess of love. Take advantage of this opportunity to have all the people leaders, Mazzinians, rascals of all sorts arrested, without which we shall have them another day in another city. Leave the responsibility for that to General Della Rocca, if you wish.

— Victor Emmanuel II to Marco Minghetti, 22 September

There were a few demonstrations during the day against the printing press of the Turin Gazette, but these were easily dispersed.

Evening

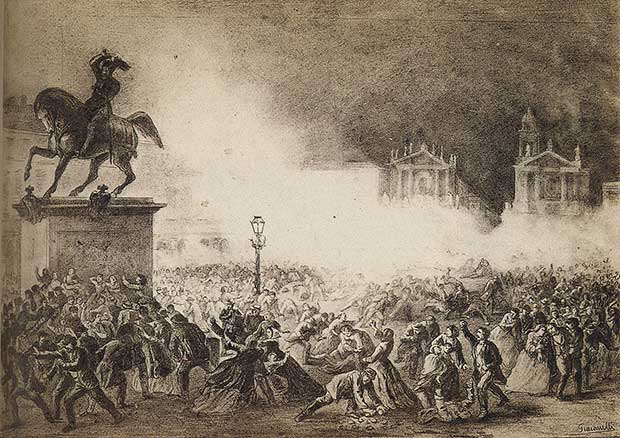
The clashes under the monument

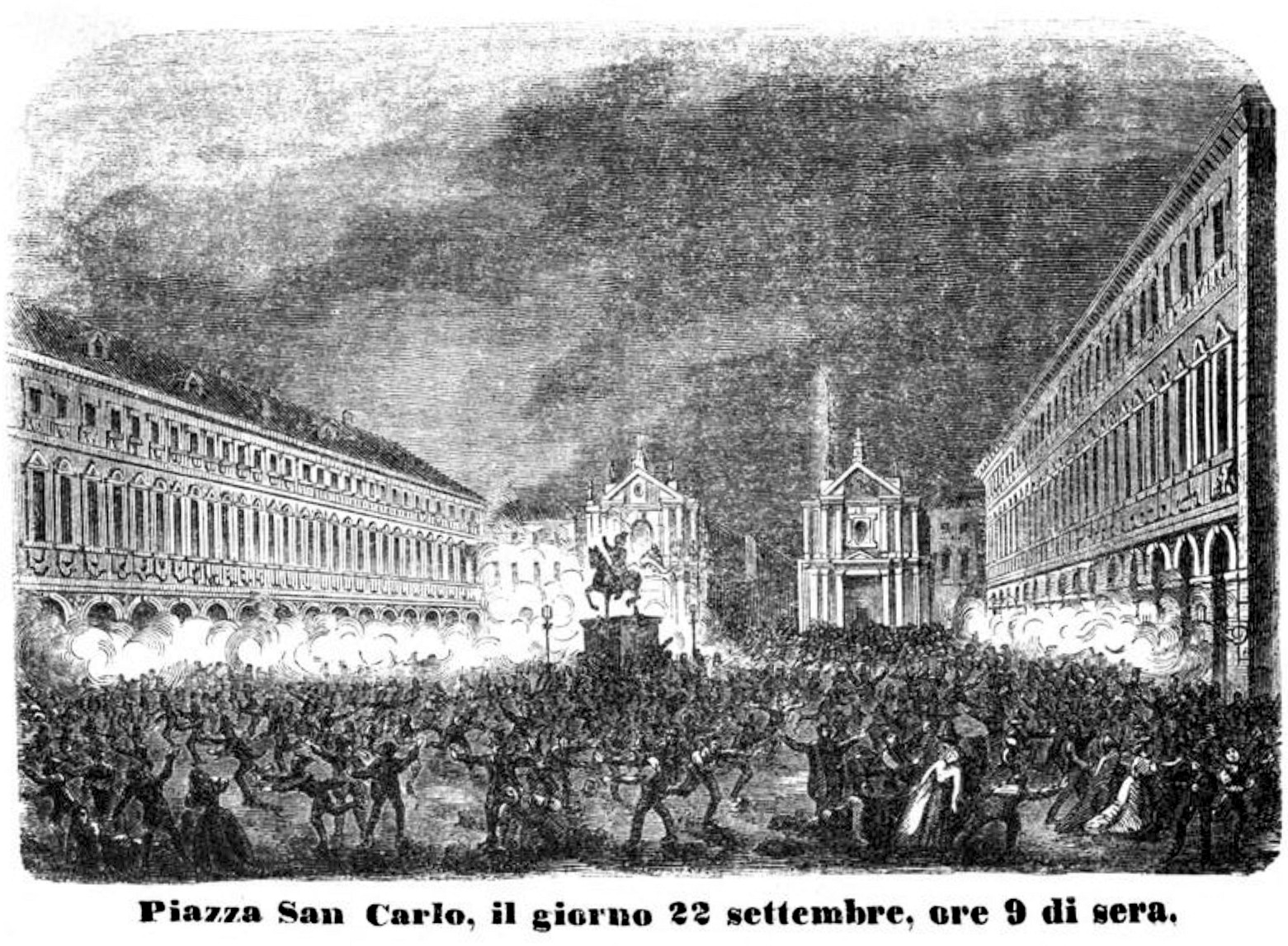
Piazza San Carlo on September 22 at 9 pm

In the evening, several gatherings formed around the city which insulted the carabinieri and public security officers present in the streets and reached Piazza San Carlo. In the square, defending the police headquarters, were the carabinieri, infantry and public security officers, but without coordination between the different corporations. The square was crowded, however, and carriages passed regularly. The presence of the carabinieri was the cause of insults, as they were accused of firing on helpless citizens the day before; the commanders' proposal to withdraw the carabinieri from the square to avoid incidents was not approved by the police commissioner.

A vast cackling gathering, described as consisting largely of drunkards, arrived in the square and began cursing at the carabinieri present and throwing stones at the police headquarters. The police commissioner then ordered more troops out, including carabinieri cadets, to ward off those who were present. As intimations were being made for the crowd to disperse, gunshots were heard and the carabinieri fired toward the center of the square, hitting an infantry battalion that was crossing it; public security officers in turn fired from the door of the police headquarters. In the ensuing confusion, numerous shots were fired from various directions by the military officers present; when the firing finally succeeded, numerous dead and injured people remained on the ground in the square.

The undersigned declares that on the evening of 22 September at 9 o'clock precisely, he was in front of the San Carlo trattoria in the company of a few friends, and was trying to dissuade the few rioters around him, when a trumpet blast was heard and immediately followed by a disorderly discharge made by the Carabinieri cadets who had a moment before emerged from the Police Headquarters. One of the first shells unfortunately went to hit the colonel of the 17th who at that very moment had deployed his soldiers in the line of battle; here began the painful misunderstanding: the 17th fired on the multitude and on the line that stood behind them, the latter responded by firing on the populace and on the 17th, the result was that the crowd gathered in Piazza San Carlo found itself caught between three fires, and it was consequently impossible to get out safely; many decided to throw themselves sprawled on the ground (an excellent idea in such cases), but as the troop fired the first shots, the number of injured was evidently greater.

— Testimony of Alberto Martini Bossi, who was wounded in the leg

In the square, at the foot of the monument of Emmanuel Philibert, bullet marks are still visible to this day.

== The victims ==
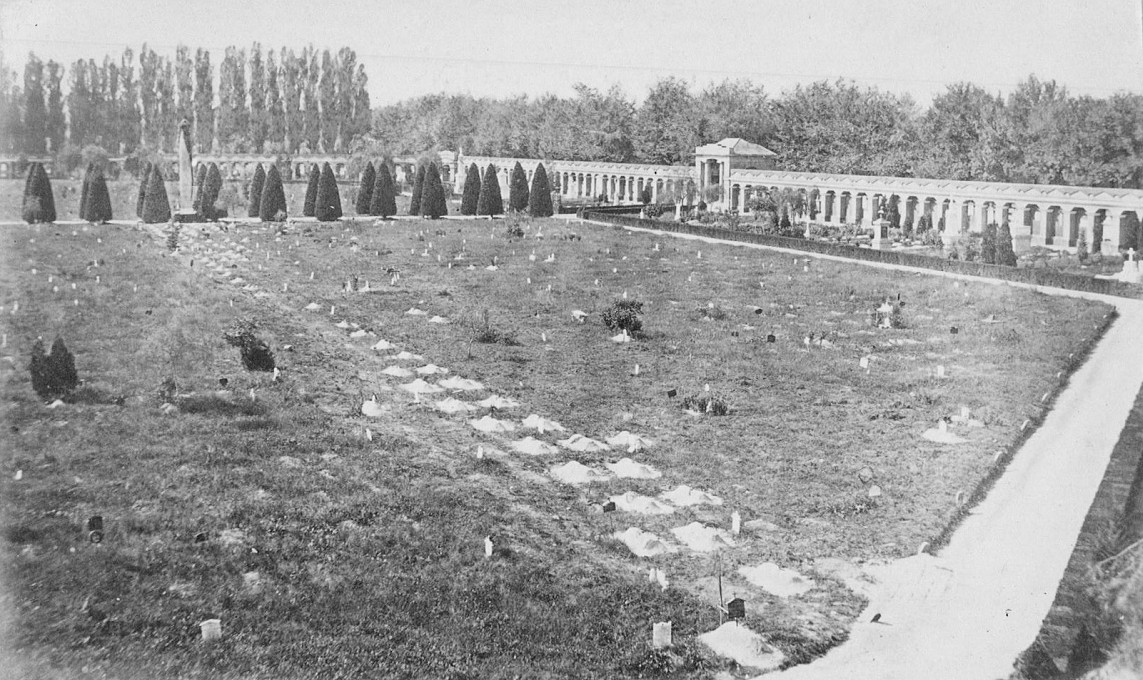
Tombs of the victims of 21 and 22 September 1864 in Turin, Italy

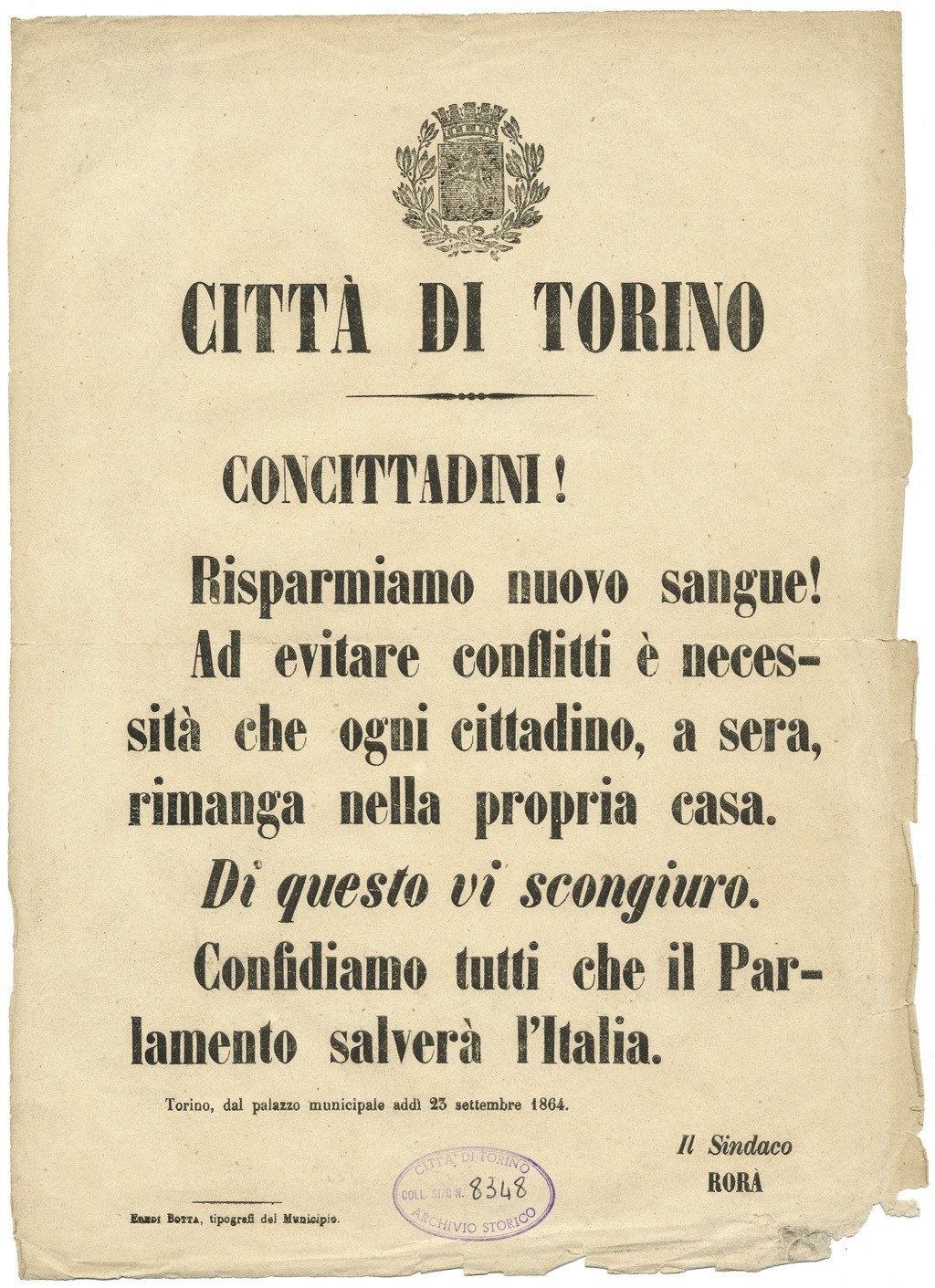
Proclamation of Mayor Emanuele Luserna di Rorà (September 23, 1864)

Data on deaths and injuries on the two days were collected by Dr. Giuseppe Rizzetti; his report was later published in at least three different versions (the first contained data updated as of 10 October, (Note: Report in Ara, pp. 129–163.) the second as of Oct 13 of the same month, (Note: Report published by the printing house of Gazzetta del Popolo) and the third updated in November).

The third version indicated 15 deaths from the 21 September events in Piazza Castello and 47 deaths from the 22 September events in Piazza San Carlo, respectively. A total of 138 injured were reported, but it is estimated that the actual number was higher, as some of the injured might have chosen to treat themselves "without medical intervention in order not to incur criminal penalties or to protect the family from possible retaliation."

Police headquarters of the district of Turin – 22 September 1864

The undersigned requests the town hall to send suitable persons as soon as possible to transport twelve corpses that are in the middle of Piazza San Carlo, as discussed with Count Corsi.

Police commissioner Chiapussi

The dead on 22 September included four military personnel; there were injured military personnel on both days.

The victims were buried in Turin's Monumental Cemetery "in a distinct square of earth to the northwest."

=== Deaths in Piazza Castello ===
1. Ceresito Ernesto (age 18), from Acqui, shopkeeper, unmarried.
2. Constantin Giovanni (23), from Prarostino (Pinerolo), shopkeeper, died 7 October
3. Dalla Lana Giulio (17), from Trento, printer, unmarried
4. Gandiglio Vittorio (17), from Turin, bank clerk, unmarried
5. Gauthier Vincenzo (50), from Vercelli, private secretary, married
6. Genovese Serafino (18), from Montiglio, baker, single
7. Gianoglio Alessandro (22), from Pinerolo, liquorman, died 28 October
8. Guerra Mattia (23), from Vicenza, baker, died 22 September
9. Longo Giuseppe (22), from Verzuolo, tailor, unmarried
10. Mayer Giuseppina wife Bertino (20), from Tronzano, dwelling in Vercelli, died 23 October
11. Meinardi Olisio (23), from San Giusto Canavese, carpenter
12. Picena Giuseppe (30), from Turin, innkeeper, married
13. Sacco Carlo (30), from Turin, scribe, died 18 October
14. Sonetto Ferdinando (20), from Almese, hotelier, died 3 October
15. Vercellino Giuseppe, from Valperga, student, unmarried, died 22 September

=== Piazza San Carlo deaths ===
1. Barone Giuseppe (30), from Arona, bricklayer, died Oct 3
2. Bartoli Carlo (54), from Vicenza, former captain, married
3. Bergamini Giovanni (23), from Finale (Mirandola district), soldier in the 17th infantry, single
4. Belfiore Giuseppe (23), from Jesi, corporal in the 17th infantry, died Oct 2
5. Belletta Agostino (25), from Pollone, shoemaker, died Sep 23
6. Bernarolo Ignazio (75), from Turin, glassmaker, died Sep 25
7. Bertinaria Basilio (20), from Netro (Biella), died Oct 12
8. Bertinetti Giovanni (19), from Pozzo Strada, railroad worker, died Oct 13
9. Bossi Giuseppe (40), from Milan, gardener, died Oct 1
10. Caldi Crescentino (21), from Ameno, bricklayer, died Oct 5
11. Campora Gaudenzio (21), from Casale, printer.
12. Carena Domenico (31), from Rocchetta Palafea, carter, married
13. Dotto Felice (20), from Ronco (Biella), bricklayer, single
14. Dutto Bartolomeo (42), from Caraglio, porter, married
15. Falco Felice (25), from Turin, shopkeeper, died Sep 28
16. Falco Filiberto (19), from Dogliani, hatter, unmarried
17. Fiorina Alberto (20), from Vercelli, carpenter, unmarried
18. Fogliasso Giuseppe (25), from Turin, bookbinder
19. Fornaro Giuseppe (21), from Valmadonna, baker, died Sep 23
20. Gedda Defendente (23), from Ivrea, machinist, died Oct 12
21. Giuliberti Vincenzo (20), from Turin, blacksmith-ironworker, died Sep 23
22. Gremo Pietro (28), from Leini, blacksmith-ironworker, died Sep 23
23. Grisoglio Bernardo (13), from Magnano, bricklayer, died Oct 19
24. Hellin Antonio (24), from Legnano, turner
25. Lanza Michele (24), from Settimo Torinese, metal smelter, unmarried
26. Lorenzini Angelo (15), from Novara, innkeeper, died Oct 20
27. Martini Giuseppe (17), from Turin, paper lineer, died Nov 3
28. Mautino Giovanni (22), from Casalborgone, mattress maker, unmarried
29. Morra Antonio (18), from Bergamo, tailor, died Oct 27
30. Negro Enrico (22), from Robella (Asti), worker in the Arsenal, single
31. Novarese Francesco (22), from Turin, watchmaker, died Oct 10
32. Oddone Matteo (18), from Feletto, shoemaker, unmarried
33. Pavesio Candido (35), from Stupinigi, shoemaker
34. Peletti Giacomo (22), from Tigliole, corporal in 66 infantry, died Oct 2
35. Pisani Lucia (27), from Frabosa Soprana, maid, married
36. Portigliatti Giuseppe (24), from Turin, printer, unmarried
37. Ramellini Biagio (24), from Novara, bricklayer, died Oct 8
38. Richetta Canuto (28), from Pont (Ivrea), worker in the Arsenal, died Sep 25
39. Rigola Carlo Alberto (15), from Turin, printer, unmarried
40. Risaia Carlo (18), from Turin, unmarried
41. Ruffino Ludovica (26), from Barolo, grocer, married
42. Salvi Emilio (33), from Rivara, porter, single
43. Sanguinetti Giovanni (54), from Vercelli, carpenter, married
44. Sbitrio Domenico (27), from Castellamonte (Ivrea), baker, unmarried
45. Vecci Trifone Maria (20), from Gagliano, soldier in the 17th infantry, single
46. Vercelli Giuseppe (22), from Borgosesia, carpenter
47. Vinone Francesco (30), from Piobesi Torinese, blacksmith-ironworker, married

== Consequences ==
=== End of the Minghetti government ===
The events of September 21 and 22 made the situation untenable for the government.

We found the king in the living room, along with some other people who wandered away. Few times have I seen a man more irritated than him; his anger was significant. He spoke of the mournful event in Piazza S. Carlo, stigmatizing, in unparliamentary words, the insipience of those who presided over public order, of those who were the cause of the massacre of so many defenseless people, even to the point of having the troops shot among themselves and having poor Colonel Colombini, who has two bullets to his temple, almost killed by his own soldiers.

— Letter from Demetrio Diamilla to Giuseppe Mazzini, Sept. 24

As the current state of affairs cannot last because it is too sad, I urge you and your colleagues to resign.

— Victor Emmanuel II to Marco Minghetti, Sept. 23

In obedience to Your Majesty's obsequious dispatch I place in your hands my resignation and that of my colleagues, ready to remain in our places until Your Majesty appoints our successors.

— Marco Minghetti to Victor Emmanuel II, Sept. 23

On the same day, the king commissioned Alfonso La Marmora to form a new government.

=== Official inquiries ===
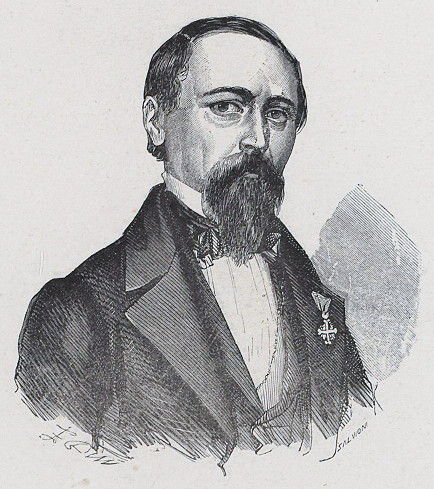
Casimiro Ara, author of the municipal inquiry

There were several inquiries to determine the course of events.

As early as the morning of September 22, after the first events, the municipal council ordered an administrative inquiry, charging deputy Casimiro Ara with this. The report of this first inquiry, delivered as early as October 5, was printed on October 11 and was then distributed to deputies and senators and to all town halls in the Kingdom.

Another administrative inquiry ordered by the Minghetti government was also not followed up due to the fall of the government itself.

A judicial inquiry was conducted as a result of a lawsuit filed on September 24, 1864, by fifteen citizens (doctors, lawyers, journalists and deputies such as Pier Carlo Boggio) against the then Minister of the Interior Ubaldino Peruzzi and Silvio Spaventa (the minister's first secretary). (Note: The lawsuit is reported in September's Giornale dei fatti, pp. 109 ff.) However, on October 24 it was quickly concluded with a "non-suit."

As a result of military inquiry 58 carabinieri and cadets were arrested, sending before a military tribunal the carabinieri present on September 21 in Piazza Castello and before ordinary tribunals the Civil Guard and carabinieri present on September 22 in Piazza San Carlo.

On Oct 24, the Chamber appointed a commission of inquiry to determine possible government responsibility, chaired by Carlo Bon Compagni di Mombello and composed of deputies Claudio Sandonnini (secretary), Giuseppe Biancheri, Francesco de Sanctis, Vincenzo Malenchini, Giovanni Morandini, Oreste Regnoli, Giuseppe Robecchi and Giorgio Tamajo.

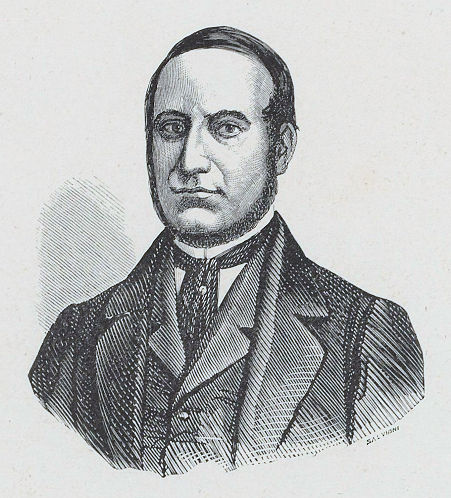
Carlo Bon Compagni di Mombello, president

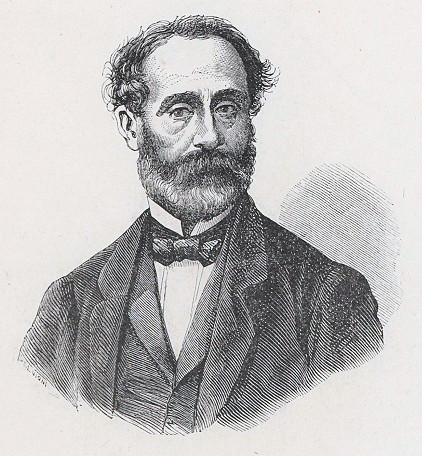
Claudio Sandonnini, secretary

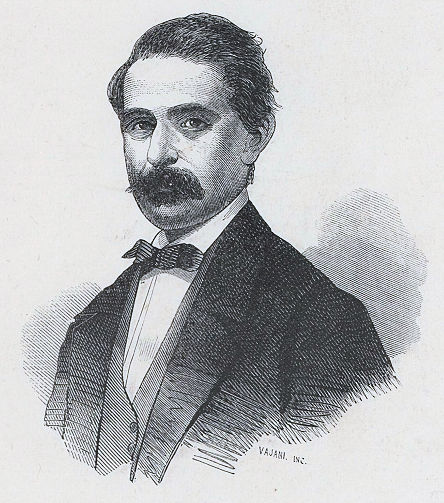
Francesco De Sanctis

Francesco De Sanctis had followed the events closely and reported the news in anonymous articles published by L'Italia of Naples.

The City Hall prepares an inquiry into the latest events; another has been ordered by the government. Testimonies are being collected; every effort is being made to clarify many points still obscure in the events. Meanwhile, the city is quiet, and some of the troops have returned whence they came. But the state of spirits is still agitated; recriminations follow, an ordinary and sad accompaniment of sad events. And here I stop. It is a page of history that one must hasten to forget.

— De Sanctis' correspondence dated Sept. 27, published in L'Italia on Sept. 29

On January 5, 1865, the parliamentary committee completed the report and it was decided to give it to the press (the proceedings, in view of their volume, were not printed, but it was decided that they should be deposited with the secretary of the Chamber). After a delay for some corrections, it was made public. The parliamentary debate was held on January 23, but it was decided on Bettino Ricasoli's proposal that no decision would be made.

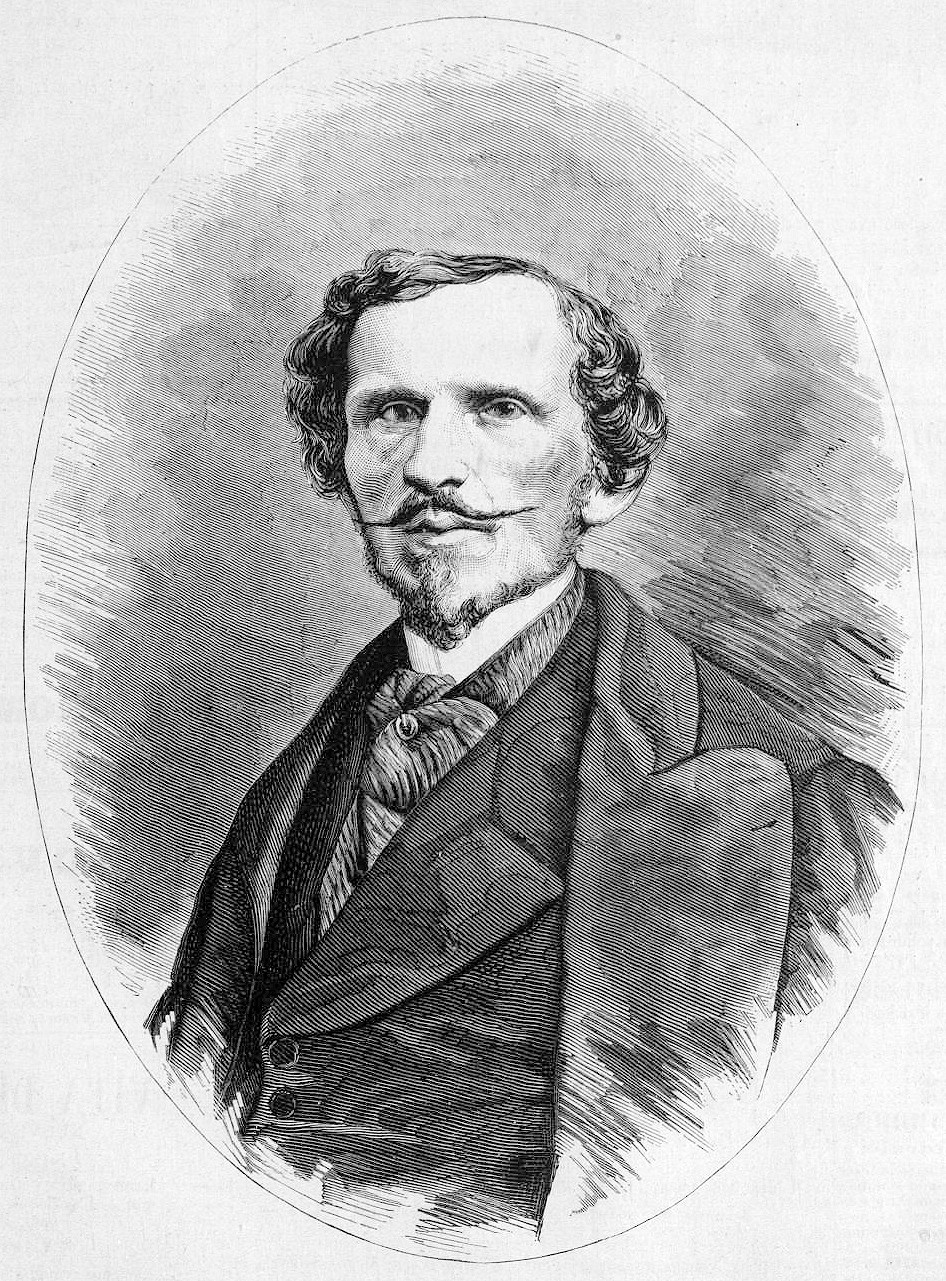
Bettino Ricasoli

The Chamber, having regard to the report of the Commission of Inquiry instituted by it to report on the deplorable events of the past September 21 and 22; Considering that Parliament must above all, and especially in the present conditions, propose to establish the order of the nation; Considering that to the tranquility and maturity of the discussions necessary for this would harm, while spirits cannot yet be soothed, the recollection of facts and events that must have deeply perturbed it; Considering that the sacrifices for long years with heroic self-sacrifice encountered and sustained by the city of Turin in favor of Italy, and the admirable demeanor observed by it while the law of the relocation of the capital was being debated, suffice to remove from her any suspicion of municipalism; Considering that the magnitude of events and the needs of the nation advise everyone to sacrifice on the altar of the homeland, and to the supreme good of concord, every sentiment, every recrimination, and even all justification; Giving thanks to the Commission of Inquiry for the diligence with which it has fulfilled the mandate entrusted to it, passes to the order of the day.

— Ricasoli's order of the day

=== Protests of January 1865 ===
The Chamber's decision not to consider the inquiry committee's report sparked new protests.

The appointed day came, and the Parliament can find no matter to discuss even in face of two hundred corpses! What do you want the people to think of institutions that give such outcomes?

— Gazzetta del Popolo, Jan. 25, 1865

On the evening of January 25, a group of students demonstrated without incident in favor of the mayor and the deputies who had supported the reasons of the people of Turin during the debates in the Chamber. There was speculation that the city administration might resign as a sign of protest. Despite fears of the worsening situation, the demonstrations on the evening of the 26th also took place without incident.

We are certain that if Minghetti and Peruzzi could fire gunshots at the Torinese people, Lamarmora would have no difficulty in shooting them with cannons. We, today as yesterday, warmly urge the country to prudence, lest it give pretexts to rage.

— Diritto, January 27, 1865

Various articles from those days, while urging calm, served to stir up tempers. There was also a collection of signatures to urge senators to vote for the inquiry presented to the House. On the evening of the 27th there was a demonstration, but not by students; there were clashes with the National Guard and 25 participants were arrested, listed as "known to the police, subject to special surveillance, several having recently left prison." Among those arrested was one student, who was released the next day.

Only one small demonstration occurred on the evening of the 28th, which was broken up by the National Guard without incident. These demonstrations, according to the mayor, were to be attributed "to the lack of work that left a good number of unemployed workers on the pavement due to the cessation of that movement that had manifested itself in the City before the relocation of the Capital."

On January 29, a court dance party was announced for the following day; in fact, Minister Giovanni Lanza believed that the situation was now calm in Turin and that there would be no incidents. Fearing new protests, however, the local authorities mobilized soldiers.

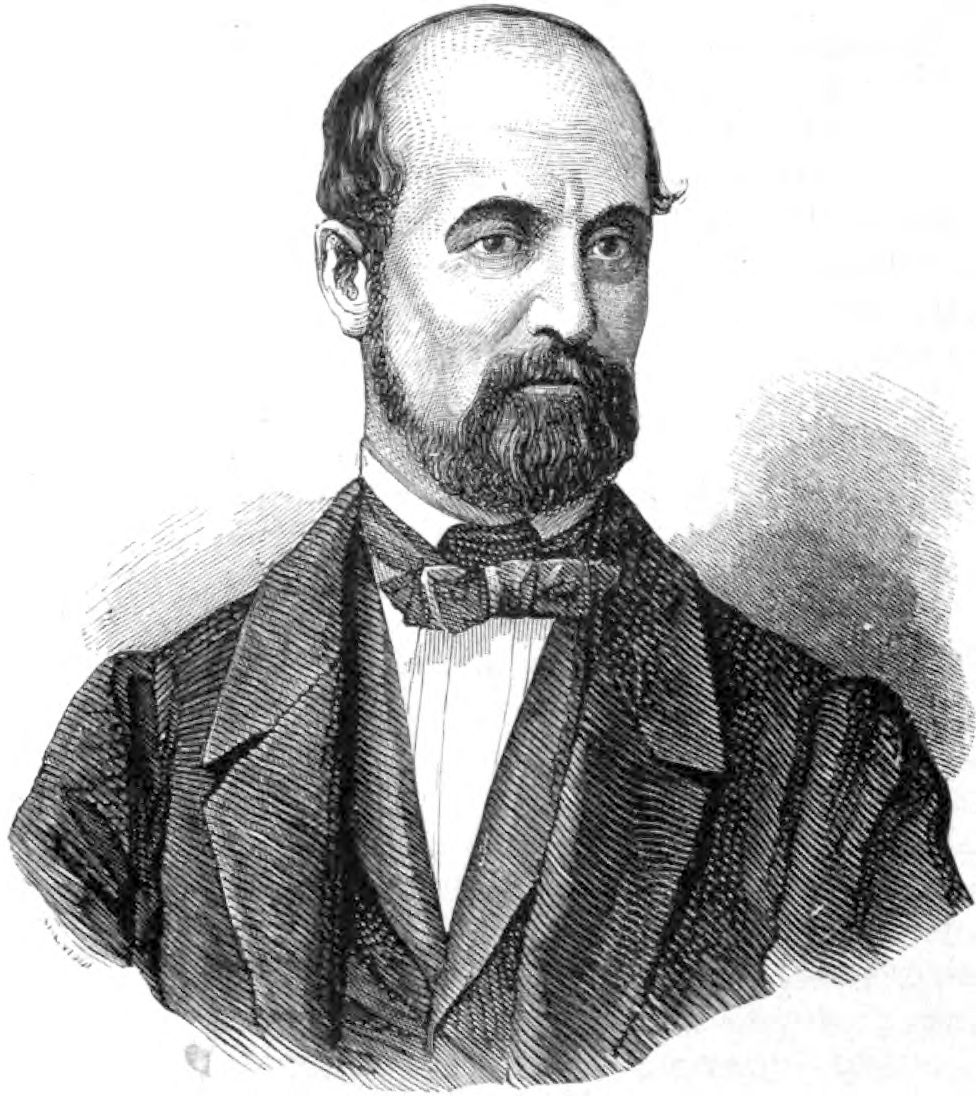
Giovanni Lanza

Never before was a ball party seen in the midst of an apparatus of soldiers, like that of the current 30th. [...] The crowd was very large, and at every passing carriage there were whistles, shouts and ungallant words directed at the ladies on their way to court. It was impossible for many carriages to approach the palace.

— Unità cattolica, Jan. 31, 1865

A carriage, in which we are told there was a general, was, for trying to pass in any way, very badly beaten, had its crystals broken, its horses beaten, and was then forced to go back. [...] Numerous arrests were made, haphazardly, as to be expected, and without basis. [...] We noticed that they were not only workers, but a great many, indeed most, by appearance and clothing could be seen to belong to the middle classes: a few boys: no predetermined design, but a certain unanimous consensus that something had to be done. No one knew what. Even at the risk of a seizure, we will say that on all sides there was universal lamentation that the party was like an insult to Turin; it was said that while the Court, for futile reasons, used to call mourners and suspend all festivities, it was strange that it could not abstain from them when its capital, the city that had been the propugnacle and defense of the dynasty, was still stained with the unavenged blood of so many victims. [...] The ball failed, and could not succeed merrily. There were perhaps 64 ladies among palace ladies, wives of ministers and ambassadors, and a few foreigners-none from the Turin aristocracy, none from the rich bourgeoisie. The cotillion was danced at 12:30 amid the cold and squalor. An unbearable cold reigned in the almost empty drawing rooms. The whistles and shouts of the people could be heard from up there.

— Diritto, Jan. 31, 1865 (the newspaper was seized)

On January 31 Lanza submitted his resignation, which was withdrawn only upon the king's intervention.

On the morning of February 3 Victor Emmanuel II left Turin for good to move to Florence.

=== Amnesty ===
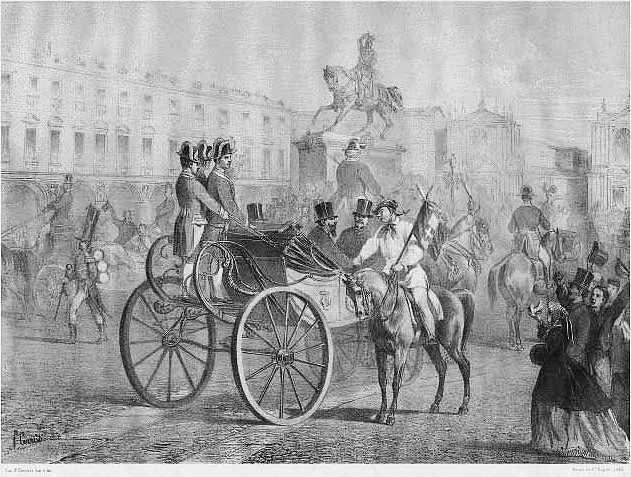
The Gianduia

On Sunday, February 26, 1865, the king was back in Turin for the carnival. Several court carriages participated in the festivities, and the king's appearance was greeted by applause. The carriage was approached by a Gianduja who addressed the king with the words, "You see in what a state I am already reduced, yet if for Italy and for you it will be necessary to give this last garment I am ready to do so." (Note: The event was also reported in an engraving of the time distributed by Federico Dogliotti (who had disguised himself as Gianduia), to raise funds for the poor. Scritti postumi di Massimo d'Azeglio, Florence, 1871, p. 447.)

The festive reception allowed the king to "erase all memory of painful events on which it highly matters that the veil of oblivion be drawn"; by royal decree of the same day a complete amnesty was granted for the events of September 1864 and for the events of late January 1865.

On the proposition of Our Ministers Secretaries of State for the Affairs of Grace and Justice and Cults, of War; Having heard the Council of Ministers,

We have ordained and order the following:

Art. 1. Full and entire amnesty is hereby granted, and criminal prosecution is consequently abolished for all the events that occurred in Turin on the last January 30, which have given or may give rise to criminal proceedings by way of offense against Our Royal Person.

Art. 2. Criminal prosecution is likewise abolished, and the penalties imposed for all events that occurred in Turin on September 21 and 22, 1864, and January 27, 28 and 29, 1865, having the character of revolt or outrage against public force, of contravention of the provisions of the Public Security Law relating to gatherings, or of violence committed in the execution of orders or deliveries, or by excess in the use of public force, are hereby condoned;

Art. 3. It is finally abolished the criminal prosecution for all crimes committed up to the present day by means of the press, which have relation to the facts mentioned in the two previous articles.

[...] Given at Turin on February 26, 1865. Victor Emmanuel

Therefore, there would be no consequences for either the protesters arrested on such occasions or the soldiers arrested after the military inquiry.

A document dated February 9, 1866, from the historical archives of the Ministry of Foreign Affairs (attached to a communication from the Italian consul in Montevideo dated Feb. 13) reports that Giacomo Ramò, captain of the boat Emilia, stated that he had transported from Genoa to Buenos Aires 138 enlisted men for the Argentine government delivered to him by security guards on Oct 14 and 16, 1865; for the 72 embarked on Oct 14 he was reportedly told that "they were part of the Turin uprising of Sept. 21 and 22 and that portions were being extracted from the prisons of Sant'Andrea in Genoa." However, there is no corroboration of these statements from other sources.

== Against Piedmontism ==
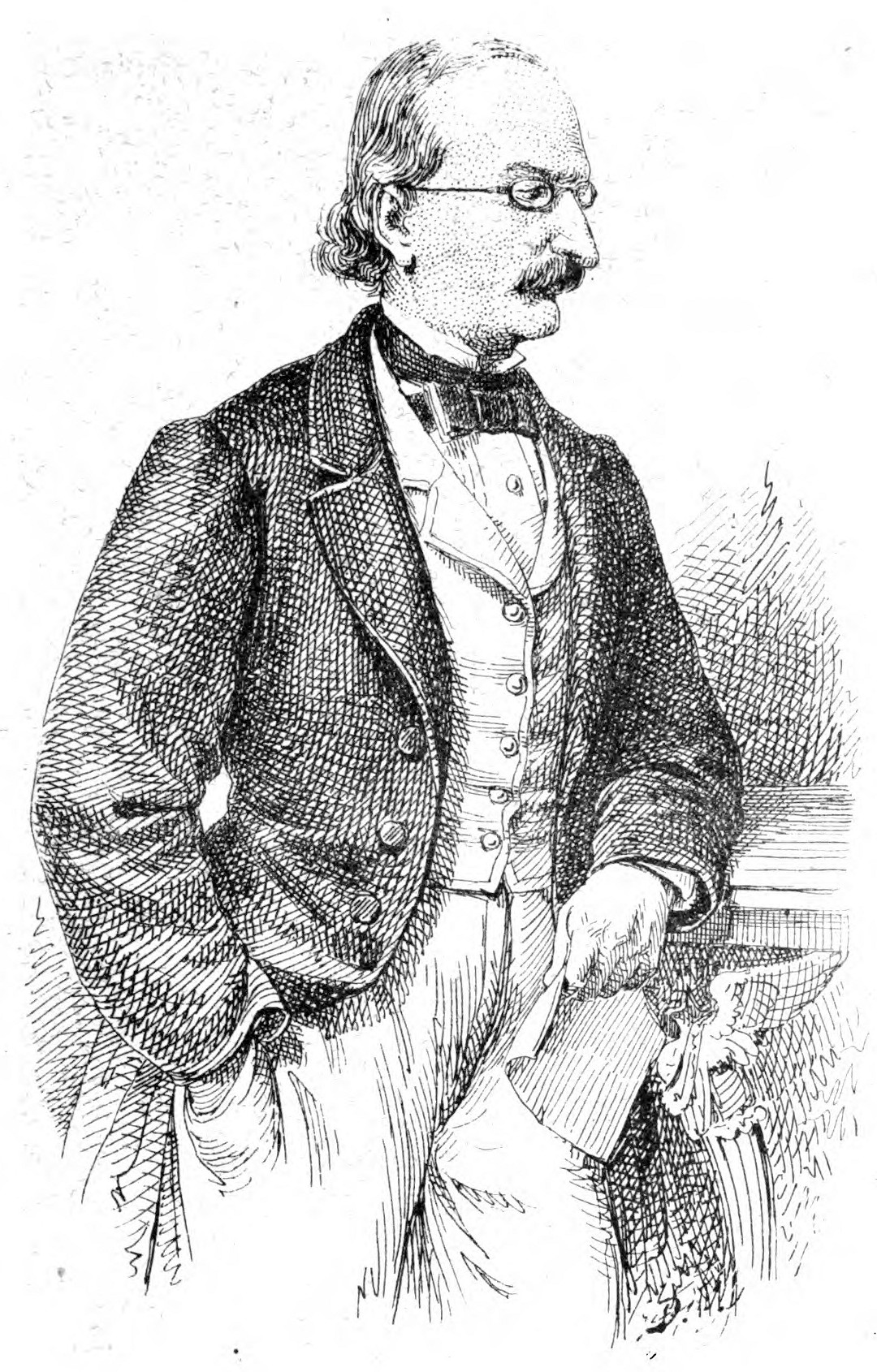
Ubaldino Peruzzi

Several non-Piedmontese deputies and members of the government were in favor of relocating the capital from Turin because they considered the Piedmontese presence within the public administration excessive.

In publications and newspapers from Turin at the time, the idea of a plan by the president of the Council Marco Minghetti (from Bologna), the minister of the interior Ubaldino Peruzzi (from Florence) and the secretary Silvio Spaventa (from Naples) to provoke riots and to be able to suspend or take away civil liberties was circulated; the presence of provocateurs who would stir up the crowd was mentioned.

Modern historians have found no credible evidence for contemporary allegations of a prearranged provocation. However, Peruzzi and Spaventa exploited the riots to reinforce anti-Turin sentiment in the government.

Peruzzi and Spaventa exploited every opportunity, however, to make Turin appear negative and to make it necessary to relocate the capital: Peruzzi incited anti-Piedmont demonstrations in Italian cities; Spaventa manipulated the communications of the Stefani Agency concerning the events in Turin so as to place the responsibility on the population and the municipality.

== Commemorations ==
=== Since 1865 ===
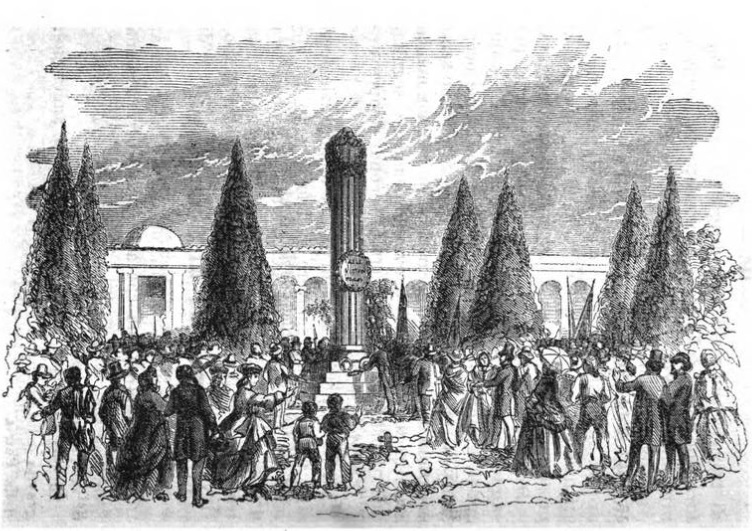
First commemoration of our fallen soldiers on the evenings of September 21 and 22, 1864 in Turin (Almanacco nazionale per il 1866)

On September 21, 1865, many stores were decorated in mourning. On the morning of September 22, 1865, an initial mourning procession was formed by the association of cooks and waiters, due to commitments related to their profession; all other associations gathered to go through the center headed for a church service and then to the cemetery and lay wreaths on the graves of the deceased.

The gathering of the citizens was immense. The vast Victor Emmanuel Square was packed; the vast Po Bridge was so overrun that even by force it would not have been possible to make a gap there. The Committee's invitation was answered, as citizens, by almost all the city councilors, Rorà, Sclopis, Cassinis, etc. Other senators and former deputies also attended, such as Baron Tecco, Crispi, Laporta, etc.

After the solemn service on the Square of the Great Mother of God, which was exceedingly dignified and moving, the Corporations moved in grand order preceded by many members of the Committee specially appointed to lead the Procession, and by the young Coffee Makers, Confectioners and Distillers, who had the initiative of the Commemoration. A National Guard picket opened the march. This was followed by the Music of the National Guard, to which there is no praise sufficient for its most laudable display.

An immense wave of people made way along the Ponte di Po, Piazza Vittorio Emanuele and Via di Po. In Piazza Castello every member of the Procession, as if moved by an electric wire, lifted their hats as they passed over the mournful site where the blood of September 21 had been shed.

From this Square to the Cemetery, although enormous is the distance, all the streets were so populated, that we believe to be below the truth, saying that more than 100 thousand people took part in the demonstration.

Annual commemorations continued through the 1860s but were gradually discontinued, reflecting the government's effort to enforce historical amnesia regarding the events.

In 1867 a "monument to the victims of September" is mentioned, but in 1868 there was no monument. The image given in the National Almanac for 1866 with a funerary stele is to be considered fictional, because in 1865 wreaths were laid on individual graves, and no monument is mentioned in the description.

=== Tombstone in Piazza San Carlo ===
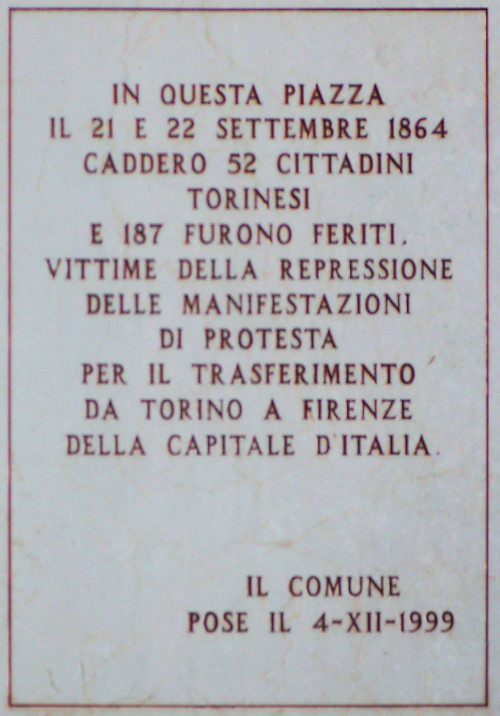
Memorial plaque in Piazza San Carlo

In December 1999, the city of Turin placed a plaque in Piazza San Carlo in memory of the victims.

IN THIS SQUARE / ON SEPTEMBER 21 AND 22, 1864 / 52 CITIZENS / OF TURIN DIED / AND 187 WERE INJURED, / VICTIMS OF THE REPRESSION / OF PROTEST / DEMONSTRATIONS / FOR THE TRANSFER / OF THE CAPITAL OF ITALY / FROM TURIN TO FLORENCE. THE MUNICIPALITY / PLACED ON 4-XII-1999.

— Plaque text

The plaque's figure of 52 deaths reflects the first version of Dr. Rizzetti's report (completed October 10), which likely combined incomplete data from both piazzas. However, Rizzetti's final report, completed in November and cited in the article body, documented 15 deaths on September 21 and 47 on September 22, totaling 62. The municipal authorities selected the earlier, lower figure for the plaque, resulting in historical underrepresentation of the casualties.

=== 150th anniversary ===
On September 22, 2014, the Turin City Council commemorated the 150th anniversary of the incident.

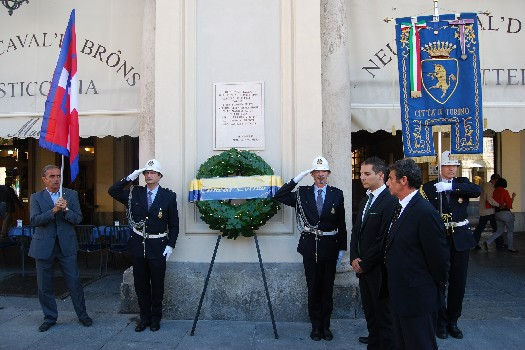
Commemoration of 2014

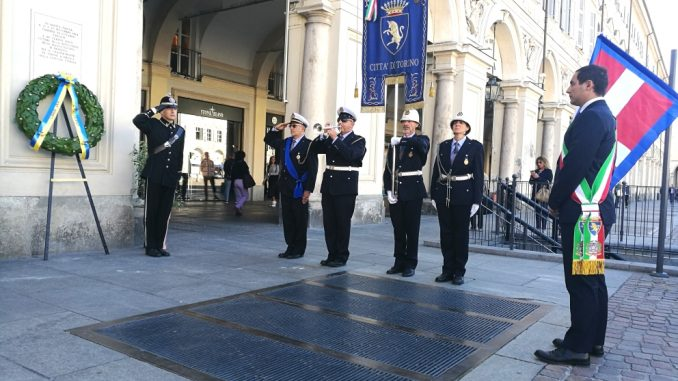
Commemoration of 2017

== See also ==
- Kingdom of Italy
- September Convention
- First Minghetti government

== Bibliography ==
- Ai Deputati del Parlamento nazionale: osservazioni e documenti intorno alla lettera del 13 corrente di S .E. il generale della Rocca Senatore del Regno sui fatti del 21 e 22 settembre 1864. Turin. 1865.
- Le giornate di Torino nel settembre 1864. Turin: Tip. Artero e comp. 1864.
- Ara, Casimiro, ed. (1864). Inchiesta amministrativa sui fatti avvenuti in Torino nei giorni 21 e 22 settembre 1864. Turin: per gli eredi Botta.
- Della Rocca, Enrico (1865). Ai Senatori del Regno: osservazioni e schiarimenti del senatore Della Rocca intorno ad alcuni punti della Relazione della Commissione d'inchiesta parlamentare sui fatti del 21 e 22 settembre 1864. Turin.
- Della Rocca, Enrico (1865). Risposta del Generale Senatore Della Rocca alle Osservazioni degli Onorevoli Deputati (ex-Ministri) Minghetti, Peruzzi, Pisanelli e Visconti-Venosta. Turin.
- Italian diplomatic documents. Vol. V. Rome: Istituto Poligrafico dello Stato. 1977.
- Fiorentino, Franco (1864). Roma o Torino. Turin: Tipogradia del Diritto.
- "Giornale dei fatti di settembre". Almanacco Nazionale per l'Anno 1865: 67–128.
- Gabotto, Ferdinando (1917). "Gli strascichi del 23 gennaio 1865 in Torino". Il Risorgimento Italiano.
- Gremmo, Roberto (1999). La prima strage di Stato. Le «Giornate di sangue» di Torino del 21 e 22 settembre 1864. Biella: Storia ribelle.
- Levra, Umberto (2001). Dalla città "decapitalizzata" alla città del Novecento. Vol. 7. Storia di Torino. Da capitale politica a capitale industriale, 1864–1915. Turin: Einaudi. pp. XIX–CLXI.
- Monti, Valerio (2014). La strage impunita. Torino 1864. Turin: Savej. ISBN 978-88-99048-00-6.
- Rizzetti, Giuseppe. "Relazione dell'ispettore sanitario, signor dottore Giuseppe Rizzetti sugli avvenimenti che funestarono la città di Torino nei giorni 21 e 22 settembre 1864". Almanacco Nazionale per l'Anno 1865: 180–229.
- Rossi, Teofilo; Gabotto, Ferdinando (1914). "Documenti sulle giornate di settembre a Torino nel 1864". Bollettino Storico Bibliografico Subalpino. Supplemento Risorgimento (4): 1–32.
- Rossi, Teofilo; Gabotto, Ferdinando (1915). "Le giornate di settembre a Torino del 1864 secondo vecchi e nuovi documenti". Il Risorgimento Italiano: 1–96.
- Sandonnini, Claudio (1865). Relazione della commissione d'inchiesta parlamentare sui fatti del 21 e 22 settembre 1864. Camera dei deputati.
- de la Varenne, Charles (1865). La vérité sur les événements de Turin en septembre 1864 par M. Charles de la Varenne avec le rapport officiel de la commission d'enquête parlementaire (PDF). Paris: E. Dentu, éditeur – Libraire de la societé des gens de lettres.
- Veneziano, Marco (1864). Il Ministero dell'assassinio e le notti di Torino del 21 e 22 settembre 1864. Lugano.
- Castronovo, Valerio (1987). Torino. Bari-Roma: Laterza. ISBN 978-88-420-2884-0.
