= Silvio Spaventa =

Italian politician

The Honourable Silvio Spaventa
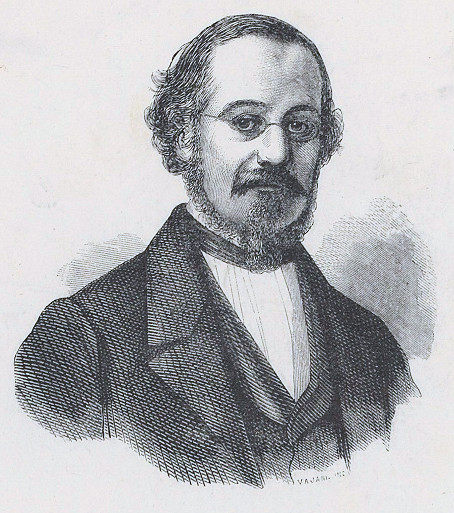

Member of the Italian Senate
- In office 30 May 1886 – 23 November 1890
- Constituency: Naples

Personal details
- Born: 12 May 1822 Bomba, Abruzzo, Kingdom of the Two Sicilies
- Died: 20 June 1893 (aged 71) Rome, Kingdom of Italy
- Party: Historical Right
- Relatives: Bertrando Spaventa (brother); Benedetto Croce (nephew)
- Profession: Journalist, politician, tutor

Silvio Spaventa (12 May 1822 – 20 June 1893) was an Italian journalist, politician and statesman who played a leading role in the unification of Italy, and subsequently held important positions within the newly formed Italian state.

== Early life ==
Younger brother of the Italian philosopher Bertrando Spaventa, Silvio was born into a middle-class family of limited means. His mother, Maria Anna Croce, was the great-aunt of philosopher Benedetto Croce. When Croce's parents died in an earthquake, in 1883, Silvio became his guardian, an experience that had a deep influence on Croce.

In 1836, Silvio joined his brother at the Diocesan Seminary in Chieti. In 1838 he moved, along with Bertrando to Montecassino, to study at the Benedictine seminary. It is probable they were sent to Montecassino because new political and religious ideas were allowed to flourish there. Silvio befriended the philosopher Antonio Tari. In 1840, in collaboration with two other seminary students, he began his political career by writing a petition to the king of Naples, Ferdinand II, demanding a constitution.

In 1843, he moved to Naples to work as tutor to the children of the magistrate Benedetto Croce, his maternal uncle, and grandfather of the famous philosopher of the same name. Like his elder brother, Silvio became interested in liberalism and the thought of Hegel, and soon had to leave Naples on account of his political views. Moving to Tuscany, he forged strong links with a number of local moderate politicians. After returning to Naples in February 1848, and following the granting of a constitution, he founded Il Nazionale. After the newspaper's first issue, on 1 March 1848, within a short time it became a point of reference for the liberal middle class, and even found favour in more conservative and royalist circles. During this period he also founded, with the help of Luigi Settembrini and Filippo Agresti, a secret society named the Grande Società dell'Unità Italiana, the aim of which was the overthrow of the Bourbon dynasty.

Spaventa was elected to parliament, where he joined the effort to give Neapolitan patriotism a national dimension. This included lending strong support to the sending of troops of the Kingdom of the Two Sicilies to fight in the First Italian War of Independence.

== Exile ==
Shortly after granting the constitution, the Bourbon king of Naples, Ferdinando II of the Two Sicilies, promptly abolished it on 15 May 1848 and proceeded to bombard the anti-royalist strongholds of Naples. Spaventa, accused of supporting General Guglielmo Pepe's resistance movement, was arrested on 19 March 1849 and held in the prison of San Francesco. On being found guilty of conspiracy against the state, and sedition, he was sentenced on 8 October to hang. This punishment was then commuted to life imprisonment (as often happened under the Bourbons). He spent the next six years in Santo Stefano prison, dedicating his time to studying politics and philosophy. On 11 January 1859 his sentence was commuted once again, this time to exile for life. In all, he spent 11 years in prison, the chains used to shackle him leaving scars on his legs and affecting his gait for the rest of his life. Spaventa was put on a boat to America with 68 other exiles, including Filippo Agresti and Luigi Settembrini, both also condemned for their political activities. During the voyage a mutiny was organised by Settembrini's son, an officer in the British Merchant Navy who had talked his way onto the crew of the ship. The mutineers landed in Ireland on 6 March 1859 and Spaventa and his comrades returned to Turin via London. In Turin, Spaventa contacted Cavour, becoming a staunch supporter of the statesman and a leading advocate of his political ideas.

== Political activity after Italian unification ==
In July 1860, Spaventa was sent to Naples by Cavour and the Savoy monarchy (who were already planning an invasion of the Kingdom of the Two Sicilies, possibly under the leadership of Garibaldi). His mandate was to prepare for the annexation of the South of Italy to the future Kingdom of Italy. He unsuccessfully tried to achieve this without waiting for Garibaldi to reach Naples. On arriving there, Garibaldi, adopting the title of Dictator expelled Spaventa from the city on 25 September. He returned in October to take up the post of Minister for Police in the provisional government (from November 1860 to July 1861), dealing vigorously with the difficult situation in the city, at times with the help of Rodrigo Nolli, a landowner from the same region of Italy as Spaventa.

Silvio Spaventa was a member of the Chamber of Deputies, for the Destra storica (a liberal alliance based around Cavour), from 1861 to 1889. He was appointed Under-Secretary to the Ministry of the Interior in the governments of Luigi Carlo Farini and Marco Minghetti, becoming the principal architect of the State's policy on internal security. He organised the repression of banditry in southern Italy, and of the disturbances in Turin, in 1864. These took place in response to the September Convention, which resulted in the capital of Italy being moved from Turin to Florence. In 1868 Spaventa was appointed a member of the Council of State where, on 6 May 1880, he delivered has famous speech on “justice in government”. From July 1873 to March 1876, he was Minister for Public Works in the second Minghetti cabinet. While in this post, he promoted the law to nationalise the railways. The resulting withdrawal of support from Tuscan members of parliament led to the fall of the government in March 1876 and the demise of the Destra storica political alliance.

Silvio Spaventa became a Senator in 1889 and, through the good offices of Francesco Crispi was also appointed to the IV section of the Italian Council of State.

== Political and philosophical thought ==
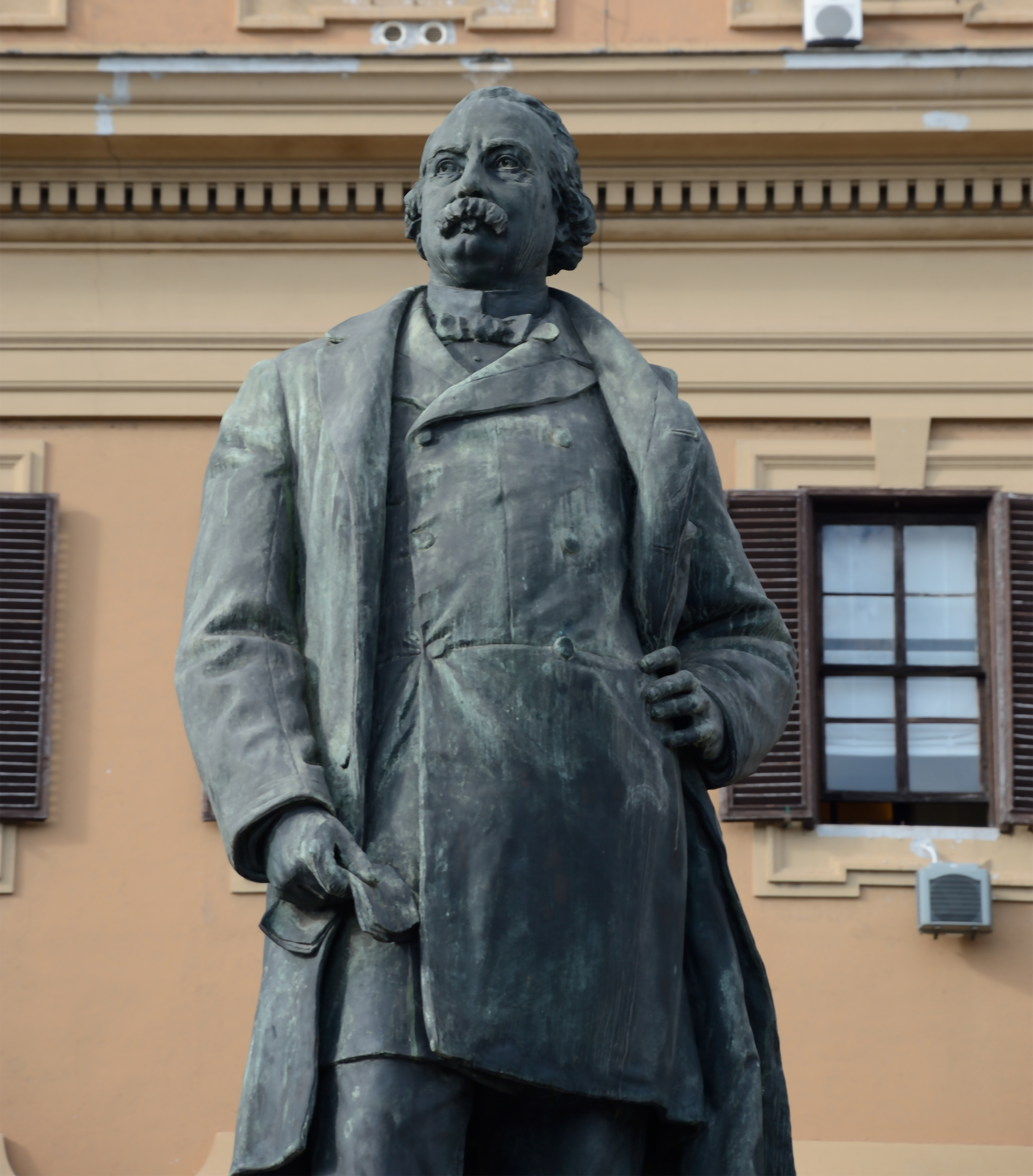
Statue of Spaventa outside the Ministry of Economy and Finance building, Rome.

There is evidence that Silvio was the first to propose that “classical” German philosophy descended directly from Italian philosophy of the 16th century. This idea was to become of key importance in Bertrando Spaventa's Hegelian theory of history and the state.

Strongly influence by Hegel's philosophy of the state, Silvio Spaventa's theory of liberalism was one of the most original of 19th century Italy. He wrote that the state should be strong, but not authoritarian. He also fought tenaciously for a rigorous separation of the political and administrative spheres of government, and argued against Agostino Depretis's trasformismo, in favour of a British-style two-party system.

Spaventa died in Rome on 20 June 1893. He was given a state funeral and buried in the cemetery of Verano in Rome.

== Main works ==
- La politica della Destra, writings and speeches, ed. Benedetto Croce, Laterza, Bari 1910;
- Dal 1848 al 1861. Lettere scritti documenti, ed. Benedetto Croce, Bari 1923;
- Lettere politiche (1861-1893), ed. G. Castellano, Laterza, Bari, 1926.

== Bibliography ==
- R. De Cesare, Silvio Spaventa e I suoi tempi, in Nuova Antologia, Vol. XLVI, Florence 1893;
- Bertrando Spaventa, Scritti filosofici, ed. G. Gentile, Ditta A. Morano & Figlio, Napoli, 1901;
- Paolo Romano, Silvio Spaventa, biografia politica, Laterza, Bari, 1942;
- Giulio M. Chiodi, La giustizia amministrativa nel pensiero politico di Silvio Spaventa, Laterza, Bari 1969;
- Elena Croce, Silvio Spaventa, Adelphi, Milan 1969;
- Saverio Ricci, Silvio Spaventa, Rivista Bergomum, LXXX, Bergamo 1990;
- Domenico Losurdo, Dai fratelli Spaventa a Gramsci, La Città del Sole, Naples 1997.
- Luigi Gentile, Coscienza nazionale e pensiero europeo in Bertrando Spaventa, Edizioni Noubs, Chieti 2000;
- Raffaele Aurini, Spaventa Silvio, in Dizionario bibliografico della gente d'Abruzzo, Ars et Labor, Teramo 1958, now in Nuova Edizione, Andromeda editrice, Colledara 2002;
- Carlo Ghisalberti, Silvio Spaventa tra Risorgimento e stato unitario, Vivarium, 2003.
