= 2017 Turin stampede =

Fatal stampede in Italy

Coordinates: 45.06773°N 7.68259°E

- Location of Turin in Italy
- Date: 3 June 2017; 9 years ago
- Time: 22:30
- Location: Turin, Italy
- Cause: Robbery attempt and bomb scare
- Deaths: 3
- Injuries: 1,672

The 2017 Turin stampede (Italian: Tragedia di Piazza San Carlo) occurred on 3 June 2017 when panic emerged in the Piazza San Carlo after a robbery attempt during a screening of the UEFA Champions League Final in Turin, Italy between local team Juventus and Real Madrid. Three people died as a result of the incident, and at least 1,672 people were injured.

== Stampede ==
The incident occurred at approximately 22:30 local time, about 10 minutes before the end of the match, when panic erupted among those at Piazza San Carlo, leading to a stampede. During the panic, a railing of stairs leading to an underground parking garage gave way, causing additional injuries.

Although the panic was initially thought to be caused by the noise of firecrackers, it was later determined to be caused by a robbery attempt of shooting pepper spray into the crowd to steal valuables among the public, and someone shouting that a bomb had gone off may have fueled the panic.

== Casualties ==
At least 1,672 people were injured, including seven who were seriously injured. On 15 June, less than two weeks after the stampede, a 38-year-old woman, Erika Pioletti, died in hospital of her sustained injuries. Another woman, Marisa Amato, became tetraplegic and eventually died in hospital on 25 January 2019. A man, Anthony Bucci, died on 31 January 2020, in hospital after two years of battling a foot injury, which required an amputation.

== Investigation ==
In November 2017, the Prosecutor Office of Turin started a formal investigation involving around twenty suspects, included the mayor Chiara Appendino and the police chief Angelo Sanna.

On 13 April 2018, eight people were arrested on charges of triggering mass panic to commit a robbery using pepper spray. One of them confessed the crime. The suspects were identified by telephone interceptions, in one of which a gold necklace stolen in the event was mentioned.

On 17 May 2019, Sohaib Bouimadaghen, Hamza Belghazi and Mohammed Machmachi were sentenced to 10 years, 4 months and 20 days in prison, and Aymene El Sahibi to 10 years, 3 months and 24 days in prison.

== Reactions ==
Some older Juventus fans said the stampede had evoked painful memories of the Heysel Stadium disaster in 1985, when 39 people, mostly Italians and Juventus supporters, were crushed against a collapsing wall by English hooligans in Brussels, Belgium, before the start of the 1985 European Cup Final between Juventus and Liverpool.

On 14 May 2019, the two first victims of the tragedy were commemorated with a plaque in the square.
