= Equestrian monument of Emmanuel Philibert =

Statue by Carlo Marochetti in Turin, Italy

Coordinates: 45°04′04″N 7°40′57″E

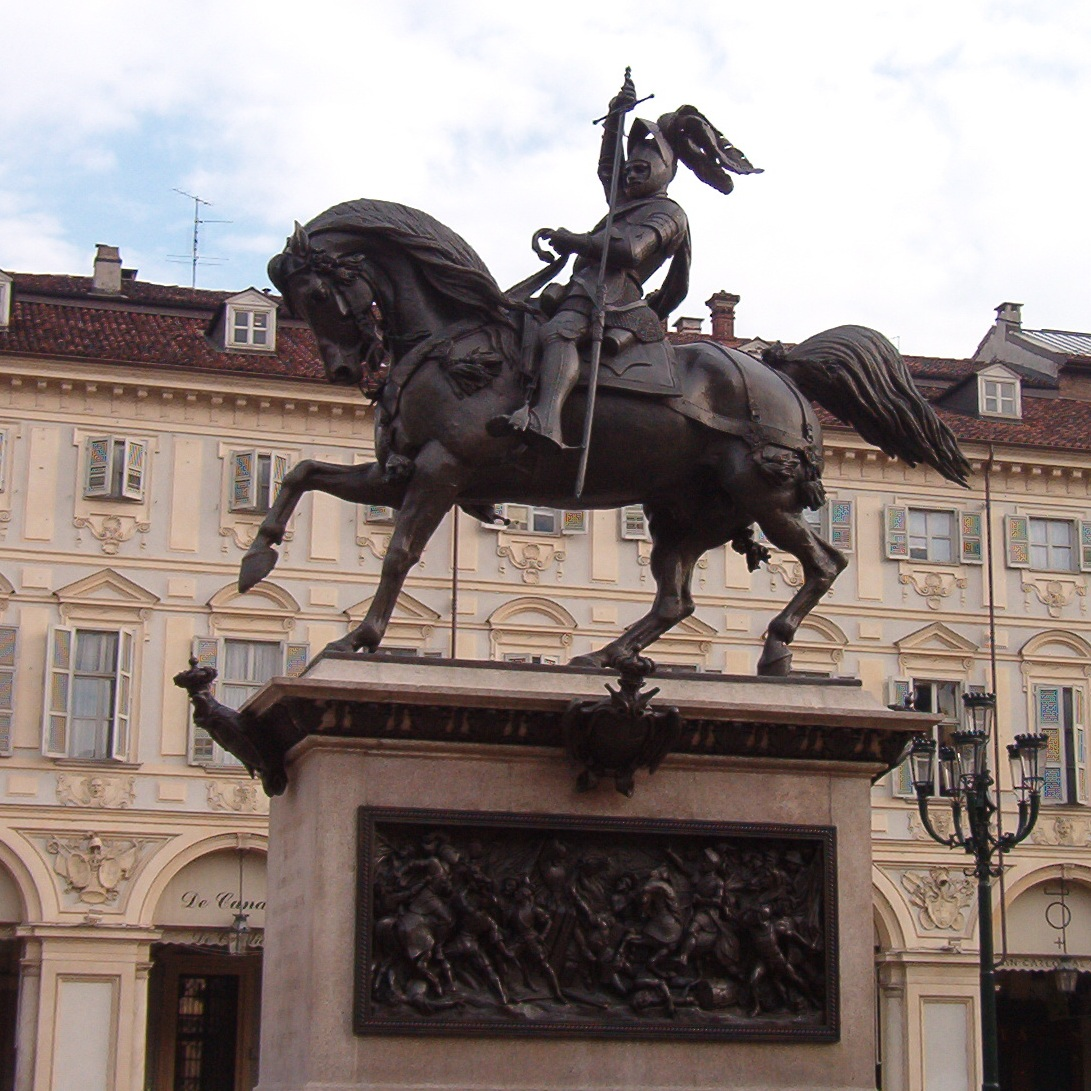
Bronze monument of Emmanuel Philibert, in Piazza San Carlo.

The Equestrian monument of Emmanuel Philibert (Italian: Monumento equestre a Emanuele Filiberto di Savoia), commonly known as Caval ëd bronz (traditionally spelled Caval 'd brons, pronounced [kaˈvɑl əd ˈbrʊŋz]; Piedmontese for 'bronze horse'), rises in the center of Piazza San Carlo in central Turin, in the Piedmont region of Italy.

== History ==
The monument was completed in 1838 in Paris by Carlo Marochetti, commissioned by King Charles Albert of Savoy to commemorate the military prowess of one of the ancestors from his dynasty, Emmanuel Philibert, Duke of Savoy. In the statue, the armored duke with a feathered helmet, astride a prancing horse, sheathes his sword, to signify his military feats. On the base, two bronze bas-reliefs depict the Battle of St. Quentin (1557) and the Treaty of Cateau-Cambrésis. An inscription celebrates the return of Emmanuel Philibert to Savoy.
