= Piazza San Carlo =

Square in Turin, Italy

Coordinates: 45.06773°N 7.68259°E

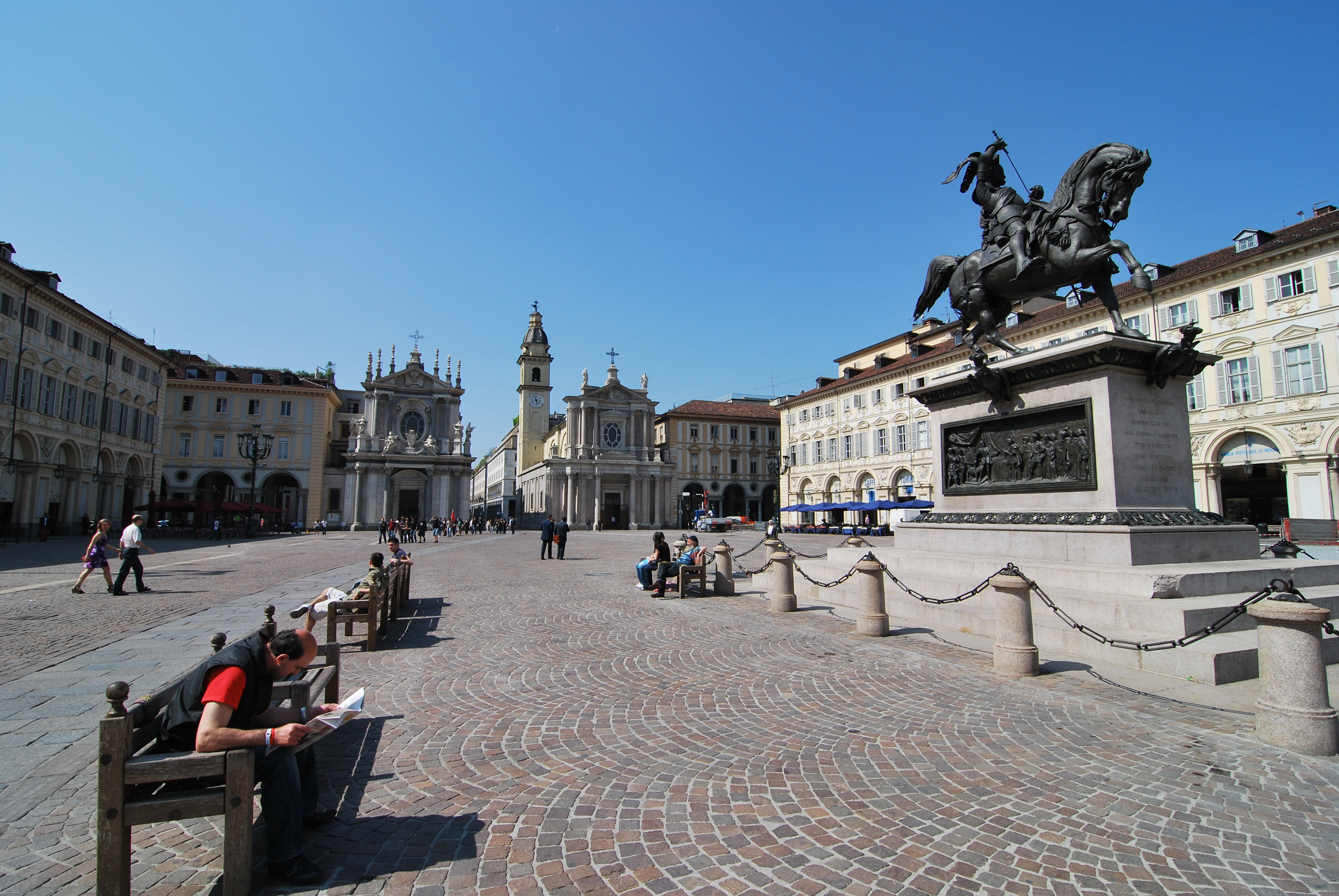
Piazza San Carlo

Piazza San Carlo ("St. Charles Square"), previously known as Piazza Reale, Piazza d'Armi, and Place Napoléon, is one of the main city squares in Turin, Italy. It was laid out in the 16th and 17th century and is an example of Baroque style.

The 1838 Equestrian monument of Emmanuel Philibert by Carlo Marochetti is located at the center of the square, which is surrounded by porticos designed by Carlo di Castellamonte around 1638. The twin churches of Santa Cristina and San Carlo Borromeo close the southern edge of the square.

== Events ==
The square has become a regular stage for various historical and social events, including election rallies, concerts, sports events (like the 2006 Winter Olympics or Juventus matches) and live TV shows. It was one of the proposed locations for the Eurovision Village at the Eurovision Song Contest 2022, before Parco del Valentino was eventually chosen as the location for the village. The Rockin' 1000 pre-recorded a performance of John Lennon's "Give Peace a Chance" in the square for the opening of the Eurovision final.

On 3 June 2017, a robbery attempt followed by a loud bang caused panic, and a subsequent stampede during a screening of the 2017 UEFA Champions League Final in Turin, killing three people and injuring at least 1,672. On 14 May 2019, the victims were commemorated with a plaque in the piazza.

== See also ==
- Turin Massacre (1864)
