= September Convention =

1864 treaty between Italy and France

The September Convention was a treaty, signed on 15 September 1864, between the Kingdom of Italy and the French Empire, under which:

- French Emperor Napoleon III would withdraw all French troops from Rome within two years.
- King Victor Emmanuel II of Italy guaranteed the frontiers of the Papal States, which at the time consisted of Rome and Latium.

Additionally, in a protocol at first kept secret, the Italian government pledged to move its capital from Turin to another city (later selected by a commission to be Florence) within six months, to prove its good faith in giving up all claims on Rome.

== Background ==
Since the subjugation of the Roman Republic by French troops during the Revolutions of 1848 in the Italian states, the French government had maintained a garrison in Rome. By 1864 Napoleon III had become deeply embroiled in creating and supporting the Second Mexican Empire. The significant investment of men and materiel gave Napoleon III a reason to reduce military commitments elsewhere, a reason that he expected would be acceptable to the French people.

== Treaty ==
According to the terms of the treaty, Napoleon III would withdraw all French troops from Rome within two years; and King Victor Emmanuel II of Italy would guarantee the territorial integrity of the Papal States. This treaty was opposed by Pope Pius IX, the French Catholics, and by Italian patriots. When the government’s move to Florence was announced, it caused widespread rioting in Turin, whose repression caused 55 dead and at least 133 wounded among the protesters; however, the King and the Italian government were duly transferred on 3 February 1865 (with the sovereign taking up residence at Palazzo Pitti). The last French troops left Rome in December 1866. Napoleon III hoped that the Italian government and the Pope would negotiate a compromise that would allow the government to move from Florence to Rome.

Because the intransigent Pius IX rejected all proposals, Italian patriots under the leadership of Giuseppe Garibaldi organized an invasion of Latium and Rome in October 1867. The patriots were defeated at Mentana by 2,000 French troops, sent by Napoleon III. A French garrison was kept in Rome to prop up the rule of Pius IX until withdrawn during the Franco-Prussian War. Not long after Rome was captured by Italian troops, historian Raffaele De Cesare made the following observations:

The Roman question was the stone tied to Napoleon’s feet--that dragged him into the abyss. He never forgot, even in August 1870, a month before Sedan, that he was a sovereign of a Catholic country, that he had been made Emperor, and was supported by the votes of the Conservatives and the influence of the clergy; and that it was his supreme duty not to abandon the Pontiff.

For twenty years Napoleon III had been the true sovereign of Rome, where he had many friends and relations ... . Without him the temporal power would never have been reconstituted, nor, being reconstituted, would have endured.

== See also ==
- Turin Massacre (1864)
